= Bjørn G. Andersen =

Norwegian professor (1924 – 2012)

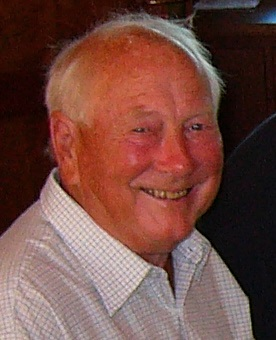
- Bjørn G. Andersen on the excursion to Greenland 2005.
- Born: Bjørn Grothaug Andersen; 23 March 1924; Stavanger, Rogaland, Norway
- Died: 12 January 2012 (aged 87); Asker, Akershus
- Spouse: Astrid E. Kruse Andersen
- Scientific career
- Fields: Quaternary geology, Glaciology
- Workplaces: University of Oslo; Yale University; University of Bergen
- Doctoral advisor: Olaf Holtedahl

Bjørn Grothaug Andersen (23 March 1924, Stavanger, Norway – 12 January 2012, Asker, Norway) was a Norwegian professor of Quaternary geology and glaciology who made foundational contributions to glacial geology and the understanding of climate change. During his career he worked as a professor at Yale University and the Universities of Oslo and Bergen. His research contributed to understanding the Scandinavian landscape foundation.

== Life and career ==
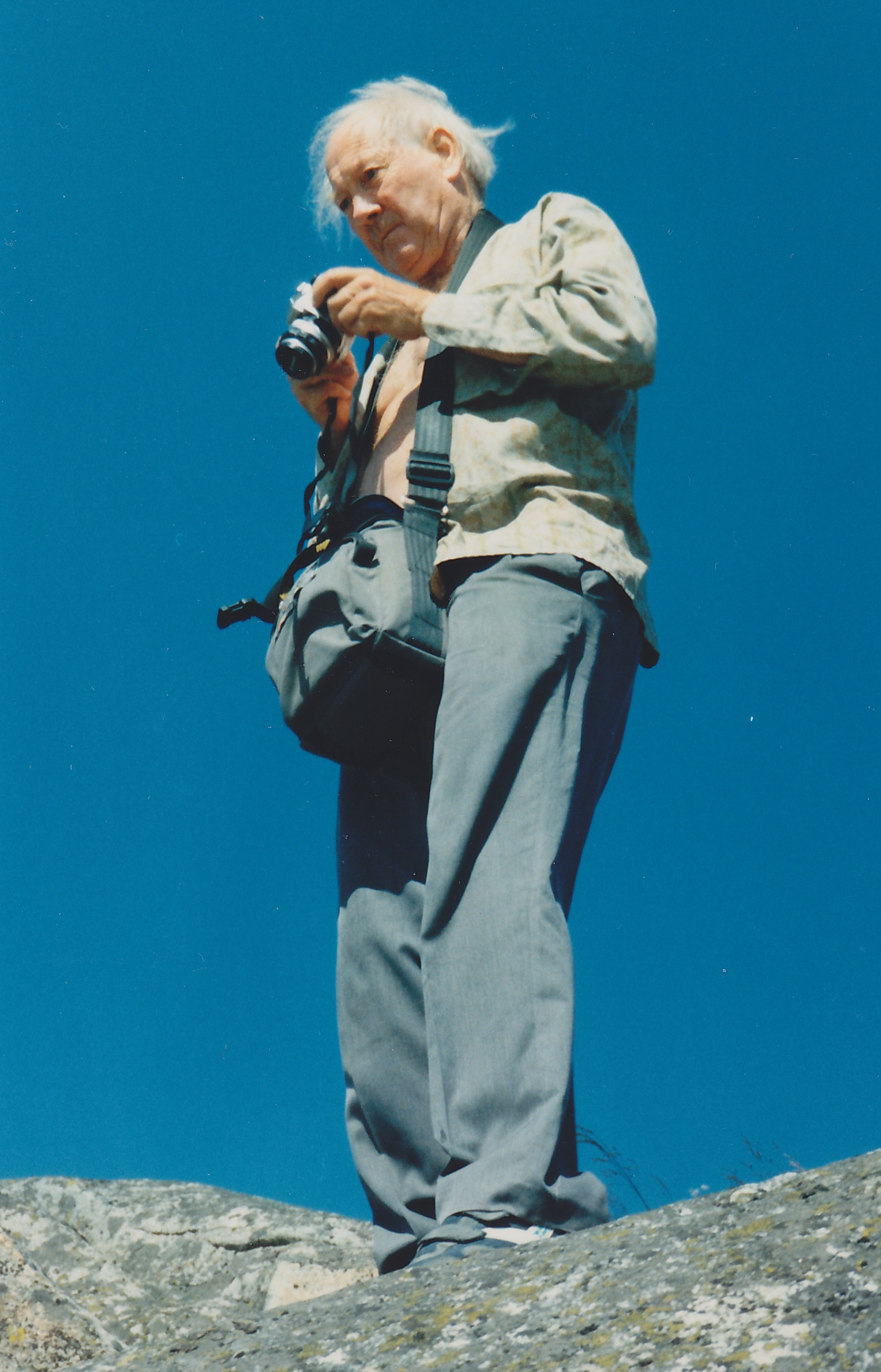
Bjørn G. Andersen on photo hunt. (Photo by Knut Andersen)

Andersen was the son of Knut Severin Andersen b. Grothaug (1882–1948), from Hornindal Municipality in Nordfjord, who was a gardener in Stavanger, and Elise Andersen b. Rafoss (1890–1987) from Stavanger (Kvinesdal Municipality). Because his father was a gardener they had a car, which was rare at the time, and using this they went skiing in the winter and fishing in the summer. He enjoyed going for long skiing tours in the mountains in Stavanger when he was young, and several times he crossed Trollgaren in Ryfylke, this marvelous moraine that is appropriate to its name. He wondered how it was formed, and was told by the local farmer that it was really Trolls that had set up the meandering fence of huge boulders, far above the tree line. The curiosity for this natural phenomenon in addition to many others in turn led to his interest for the Ice Age.

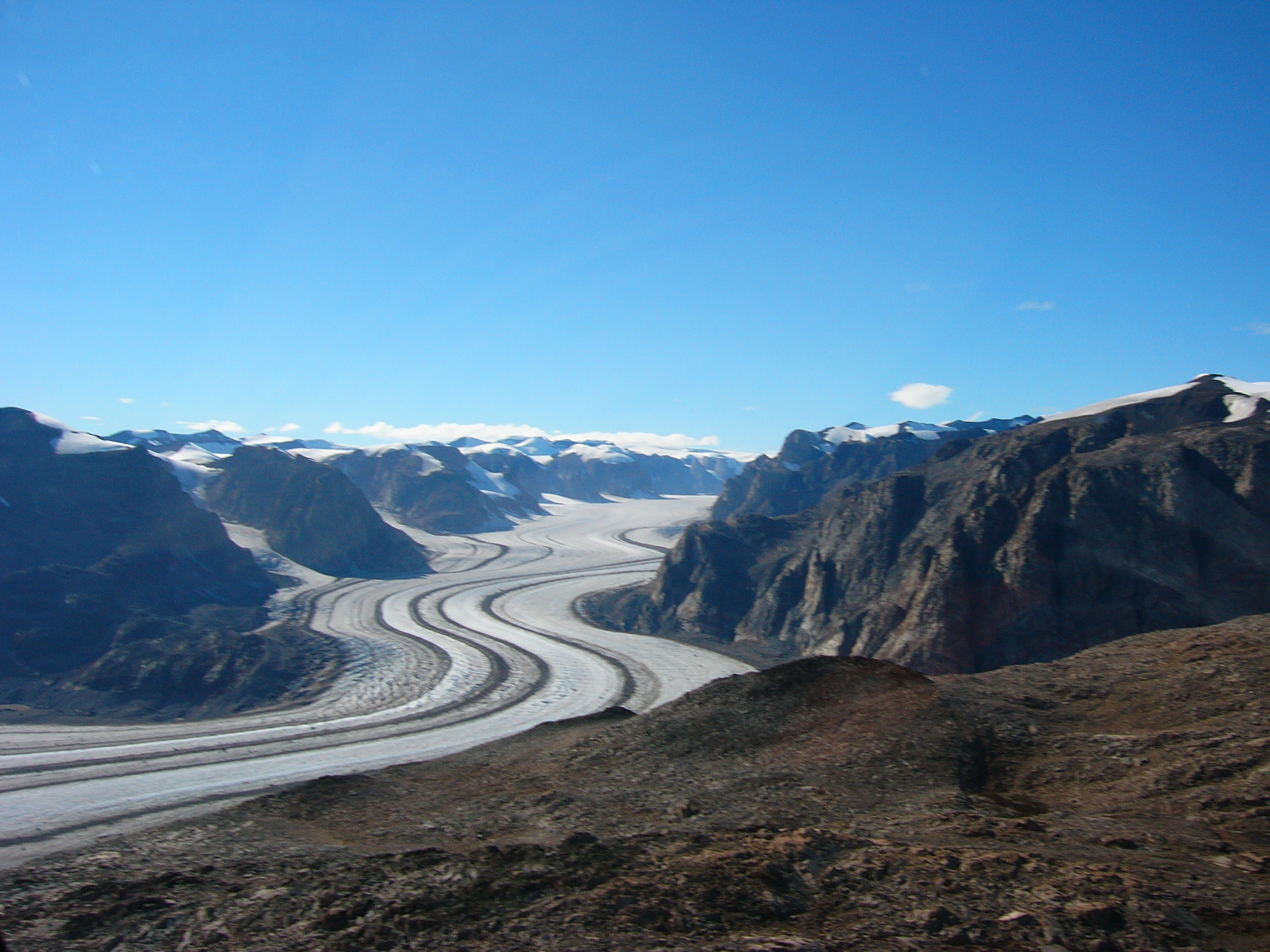
Glacier on Greenland 2005

In 1951 he married the physiotherapist Astrid E. Kruse Andersen (born 1926). After a Research Fellowship at Yale University under Richard Foster Flint in 1954–1956, Andersen was a professor of Quaternary geology at the University of Oslo from 1956 to 1970, then at the University of Bergen from 1970 to 1982. Then he returned to the University of Oslo and worked there for 9 years until retirement. He headed the geological institutes both in Oslo and Bergen. He was responsible for the geological education of more than 30 year groups of students, and he continued to participate in academic society until autumn 2011, when he had developed cancer and was in poor health. Andersen was a sought after lecturer and was acclaimed by his students, some of whom he kept in contact with until his death in January 2012.

== Contributions to Quaternary geology ==
At the University of Bergen, Andersen played a central role in building up the study of Quaternary geology. His students and the university benefited from his international contacts and he conducted filed trips to the Antarctic, South America and New Zealand. Most of all his contribution was to reveal the foundation of Scandinavian landscapes.

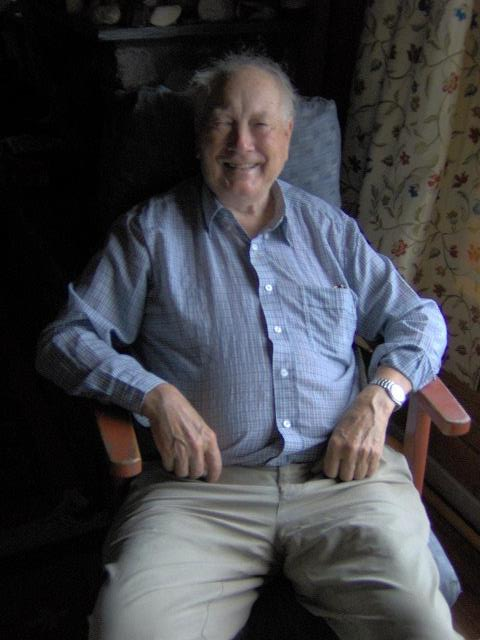
Bjørn G. Andersen on his summer house in Lillesand. (Photo by Knut Andersen)

Andersen's first expedition to the South Pole came in a period of small Norwegian interest in the Antarctic after the great achievements of Roald Amundsen in 1911–1912. Andersen was the second Norwegian to visit the Pole after the Amundsen expedition. An American expedition which reached the Pole a week before him honored his achievements by naming a mountain escarpment Andersen Escarpment after him.

During the fieldworks for his Master's thesis "Om isens tilbaketrekking i området mellom Lysefjorden og Jøsenfjorden i Ryfylke" (On the glacial retreat in the area between the Lysefjorden and Jøsenfjorden in Ryfylke), with Werner Werenskiold as advisor, he found among other things that Trollgaren was a moraine, and that it was formed in the early Holocene, probably about 11,000 years ago. Here he met his youth curiosity. Andersen broke new ground both methodologically and theoretically with this work. He developed a method for stereoscopic analysis of aerial photos in the assessment of moraines. During the 1950s and 1960s he assessed the moraines in most of Norway, from Lindesnes to Troms. The assessment of the moraines of Jæren and the rest of the south coast of Norway was the basis of his PhD thesis "Sørlandet i sen- og postglacial tid" (The Norwegian South Coast in late and postglacial time), under guidance of Olaf Holtedahl, defended in 1960.

Andersen discovered an until then unknown area of Rogaland containing rock of the Cambrian-Silurian age on a much lower level than the surrounding bedrock. His collected fossiles from this area were deposited in the Paleontologic Museum at Tøyen in Oslo. In this material Professor Gunnar Henningsmoen discovered an until then unknown trilobite species, which was given the name (Ptychparia anderseni) for Andersen. During this fieldwork in the Lysefjord area, Andersen developed a method for determination of climatic conditions from the reconstruction of Ice Age glaciers which is still used by geologists and geographers.

Andersen's first paper is one of the most basic papers in Norwegian glacial geology, even though it was published before C-14 dating was available. The Younger Dryas glacier of the Lysefjord was reconstructed in three dimensions and compared with the glaciers in Greenland today. Further, the highest side moraines were used to determine the equilibrium line of the paleo-glaciers and thus its lowering by comparison with today's glaciers. In this way he was able to estimate the decrease of summer temperature with surprising accuracy. These decreased temperatures were in compliance with the findings of botanist Knut Fægri at the Younger Dryas glacier of Jæren.

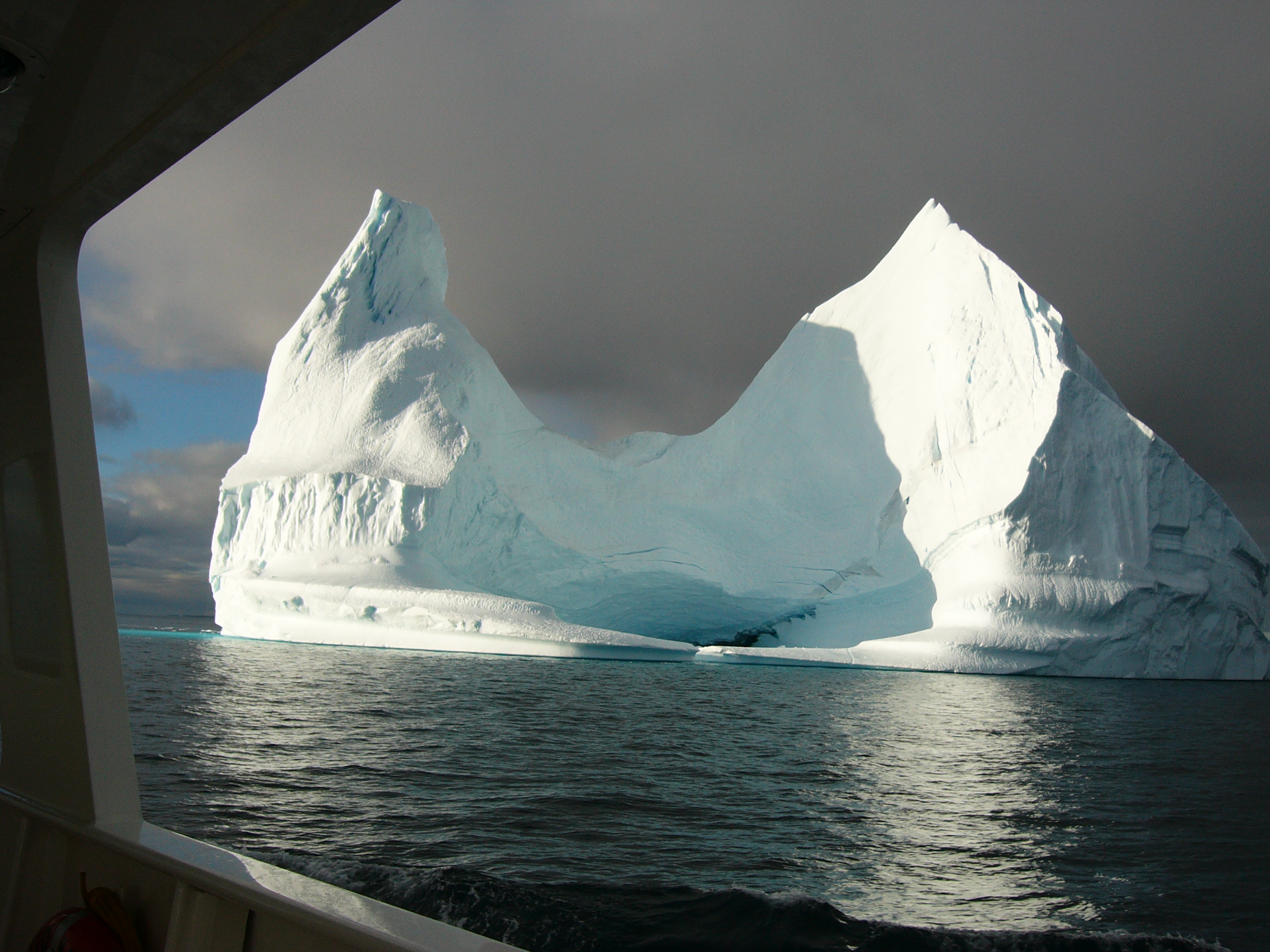
Iceberg passing the boat approacing Greenland 2005

== Mountain preservation and hiking ==
Andersen was an active mountain walker bouth professionally and for leisure. As young he went on hikes together with his father and his older brothers. Later he trawled the mountain wilds with his wife in areas like Jotunheimen, Rondane and Dovrefjell, and professionally, as Quaternary geologist he mapped the major mountain regions in Norway during the 1950s and 1960s. He also had a major part in the preservation efforts in Øvre Pasvik, Saltfjellet–Svartisen, Børgefjell, Jostedalsbreen and Hardangervidda, among others. His work in these areas was an important input in the struggle for opening the National parks there.

== After retirement ==
Andersen was a dedicated glaciologist all of his adult life. He accompanied a party of scientists doing field studies in Chile in 1991–99, and in New Zealand in 2000–08, led by the American Quaternary geologist Professor George H. Denton of the University of Maine. These studies led to a series of publications, among them papers in the prestigious international scientific journals Nature and Science. This was in addition to two books on glacial geology, one about the Ice Age in Norway: Istider i Norge, 2000, and an international textbook on the Ice Age World in 1997.

Late summer 2005, Andersen went on a trip to Greenland together with George Denton and a group of scientists. They wanted to measure the ice coverage in connection to climatic change.

In the summer of 2011 Andersen presented the results of the New Zealand research at a geological conference in Switzerland. There he also discussed the continuation of his Norwegian fieldwork, and in September–October joined a joint Norwegian-US exploratory expedition to Lysefjord led by Jan Mangerud and George Denton which investigated the application of a new dating method to the moraines he charted in the 1950s for his Master's.

== Honors ==
- 1956: Awarded the Reusch Medal for his work on Randmorener i Sørvest-Norge

== Selected publications ==
=== Scientific publications ===
- B.G. Andersen, 1954: "Randmorener i Sørvest-Norge". Norwegian Journal of Geography 14(5–6): 273–342.(in Norwegian)
- B.G. Andersen, 1960: Sørlandet i sen- og postglacial tid. Norges geologiske undersøkelse 210. OCLC 486037056 (in Norwegian).
- B.G. Andersen, 1963: "Deuterium variations relatcd to snow pit stratigraphy in the Thiel Mountains, Antarctica". Polarforsch 1963 (1/2): 200–201.
- B.G. Andersen, 1968: Glacial geology of western Troms, North Norway. Norges geologiske undersøkelse 256. OCLC 16446
- B.G. Andersen, 1972: Quaternary geology at Guolasjav'ri in Troms, North Norway. Universitetsforlaget, pp. 1–40. ISBN 82-00-08850-2
- B.G. Andersen, 1975: Glacial geology of northern Nordland, North Norway. Norges geologiske undersøkelse 320. OCLC 247679608
- Andersen, B.G. (1979). "The deglaciation of Norway 15,000–10,000 B.P". Boreas. 8 (2): 79–87. doi:10.1111/j.1502-3885.1979.tb00788.x.
- Andersen, B.G. (1980). "The deglaciation of Norway after 10,000 B.P". Boreas. 9 (4): 211–216. doi:10.1111/j.1502-3885.1980.tb00697.x.
- Andersen, B.G. (1992). "Jens Esmark—a pioneer in glacial geology". Boreas. 21: 97–102. doi:10.1111/j.1502-3885.1992.tb00016.x.
- Andersen, B.G.; Bøen, F.; Nydal, R.; Rasmussen, A.; Vallevik, P.N. (1979). "The deglaciation between Skjerstadfjord and Svartisen, north Norway". Boreas. 8 (2): 199–201. doi:10.1111/j.1502-3885.1979.tb00800.x.
- Andersen, B.G.; Bøen, F.; Nydal, R.; Rasmussen, A.; Vallevik, P.N. (1981). "Radiocarbon dates of marginal moraines in Nordland, North Norway". Geografiska Annaler. 63A (3–4): 155–60. doi:10.1080/04353676.1981.11880029.
- Andersen, B.G.; Bøen, F.; Rasmussen, A.; Rokoengen, K.; Vallevik, P.N. (1982). "The Tjøtta glacial event in southern Nordland, North Norway". Norsk Geologisk Tidsskrift. 62: 39–49.
- B.G. Andersen, O.P. Wangen, S.R. Østmo 1987: "Quaternary geology of Jæren and adjacent areas, southwestern Norway". ISBN 82-7385-027-7
- B.G. Andersen, & J. Mangerud, 1990: "The last interglacial–glacial cycle in Fennoscandia". Quaternary International 3–4: 21–29.
- Andersen, B.G.; Mangerud, J.; Sørensen, R.; Reite, A.; Sveian, H.; Thorensen, M.; Bergström, B. (1995). "Younger Dryas Ice-Marginal Deposits in Norway". Quaternary International. 28: 147–69. Bibcode:1995QuInt..28..147A. doi:10.1016/1040-6182(95)00037-j.
- Andersen, B.G.; Denton, G.H.; Heusser, C.J.; Lowell, T.V.; Moreno, P.I.; Hauser, A.; Heusser, L.E.; Schluchter, C.; Marchants, D.R. (1995). "Climate, vegetation and glacier fluctuations in Chile, between 40°30´ and 42°30´S latitude—A short review of preliminary results". Quaternary International. 28: 199–201. Bibcode:1995QuInt..28..199A. doi:10.1016/1040-6182(95)00038-k.
- B.G. Andersen, G.H. Denton, & T.V. Lowell, 1999: "Glacial geomorphological maps of Llanquihue drift in the area of the southern Chilean Lake District". Geografiska Annaler 81A: 155–66, with map portfolio including 9 plates drawn by B.G. Andersen.
- D.J.A. Barrell, B.G. Andersen, & G.H. Denton, 2011: Glacial geomorphology of the central South Island, New Zealand. GNS Science monograph 27. ISBN 978-0-478-19799-0 including 5 large maps drawn by Andersen, his last maps.
- Denton, G.H.; Bockheim, J.G.; Wilson, S.C.; Leide, J.E.; Andersen, B.G. (1989). "Late Quaternary ice-surface fluctuations of Beardmore Glacier, Transantarctic Mountains". Quaternary Research. 31 (2): 183–209. Bibcode:1989QuRes..31..183D. doi:10.1016/0033-5894(89)90005-7. S2CID 129179073.
- G.H. Denton, J.G. Bockheim, R.H. Rutford, & B.G. Andersen, 1992: "Chapter 22: Glacial history of the Ellsworth Mountains, West Antarctica". Geological Society of America Memoirs 170: 403–432.
- Denton, G.H.; Lowell, T.V.; Heusser, C.J.; Moreno, P.I.; Andersen, B.G.; Heusser, L.E.; Schlüchter, C.; Marchant, D.R. (1999). "Interhemispheric linkage of paleoclimate during the last glaciation". Geografiska Annaler. 81A (2): 107–53. doi:10.1111/j.0435-3676.1999.00055.x.
- N.R. Golledge, A.N. Mackintosh, B.M. Andersona, K.M. Buckley, A.M. Doughtya, D.J.A. Barrellc, G.H. Denton, M.J. Vandergoes, B.G. Andersen, & Joerg M. Schaefer, 2012: "Last Glacial Maximum climate in New Zealand inferred from a modelled Southern Alps icefield". Quaternary Science Reviews 46: 30–45.
- Heusser, C.J.; Denton, G.H.; Hauser, A.; Andersen, B.G.; Lowell, T.V. (1996). "Water Fern (Azolla filiculoides Lam.) in Southern Chile as an Index of Paleoenvironment during Early Deglaciation". Arctic and Alpine Research. 28 (2): 148–55. doi:10.2307/1551754. JSTOR 1551754.
- Heusser, C.J.; Lowell, T.V.; Heusser, L.E.; Hauser, A.; Andersen, B.G.; Denton, G.H. (1998). "Vegetation dynamics and paleoclimate during late Llanquihue glaciation in southern Chile". Bamberger Geographische Schriften. 15: 211–26.
- O. Holtedahl & B. G. Andersen, 1960: "Glacial map of Norway" in: O. Holtedahl et al., (1960). Geology of Norway. Norges geologiske undersøkelse 208. OCLC 1019047
- Kaplan, M.R.; Schaefer, J.M.; Denton, G.H.; Barrell, D.J.A.; Chinn, T.J.H.; Putnam, A.E.; Andersen, B.G.; Finkel, R.C.; Schwartz, R.; Doughty, A.M. (2010). "Glacier retreat in New Zealand during the Younger Dryas stadial". Nature. 467 (7312): 194–97. Bibcode:2010Natur.467..194K. doi:10.1038/nature09313. PMID 20829791. S2CID 205222031.
- M.R. Kaplan, J.M. Schaefer, G.H. Denton, A. M. Doughty, D.J.A. Barrell, T.J.H. Chinn, A.E. Putnam, B.G. Andersen, A. Mackintosh, R.C. Finkel, R. Schwartz, & B. Anderson 2013: "The anatomy of long-term warming since 15 ka in New Zealand based on net glacier snowline rise". Geology 41: 887–890.
- Miller, G.H.; Sejrup, H.P.; Mangerud, J.; Andersen, B.G. (1983). "Amino acid ratios in Quaternary molluscs and foraminifera from western Norway: correlation, geochronology and paleotemperature estimates". Boreas. 12 (2): 107–124. doi:10.1111/j.1502-3885.1983.tb00442.x.
- Presser, F.; Andersen, B.G.; Denton, G.H.; Schlüchter, C. (2005). "Luminescence chronology of Late Pleistocene glacial deposits of North Westland, New Zealand". Quaternary Science Reviews. 24 (20–21): 2207–27. Bibcode:2005QSRv...24.2207P. doi:10.1016/j.quascirev.2004.12.005.
- Putnam, A.E.; Denton, G.H.; Schaefer, J. M.; Barrell, D.J.A.; Andersen, B.G.; Finkel, R.C.; Schwartz, R.; Doughty, A.M.; Kaplan, M.R. (2010). "Glacier advance in southern middle-latitudes during the Antarctic Cold Reversal". Nature Geoscience. 3 (10): 700–704. Bibcode:2010NatGe...3..700P. doi:10.1038/ngeo962.
- A.E. Putnam, J.M. Schaefer, G.H. Denton, D.J.A. Barrell, R.C. Finkel, R. Schwartz, B.G. Andersen, T.J.H. Chinn, & A.M. Doughty, 2012: "Regional climate control of glaciers in New Zealand and Europe during the pre-industrial Holocene". Nature Geoscience 2012 (5): 627–630.
- A.E. Putnam, J.M. Schaefer, G.H. Denton, D.J.A. Barrell, S.D. Birkel, B.G. Andersen, M.R. Kaplan, R.C. Finkel, R. Schwartz, & A.M. Doughty, 2013: "The Last Glacial Maximum at 44°S documented by a 10Be moraine chronology at Lake Ohau, Southern Alps of New Zealand". Quaternary Science Reviews 62: 114–141.
- A.E. Putnam, J.M. Schaefer, G.H. Denton, D.J.A. Barrell, B.G. Andersen, T.N.B. Koffmanb, A.V. Rowan, R.C. Finkel, D.H. Roodh, R. Schwartz, M.J. Vandergoes, M.A. Plummer, S.H. Brocklehurst, S.E. Kelley, & K.L. Ladig, 2013: "Warming and glacier recession in the Rakaia valley, Southern Alps of New Zealand, during Heinrich Stadial 1". Earth and Planetary Science Letters 382: 98–110.
- Schaefer, J.M.; Denton, G.H.; Barrell, D.J.; Ivy-Ochs, S.; Kubik, P.W.; Andersen, B.G.; Phillips, F.M.; Lowell, T.V.; Schlüchter, C. (2006). "Near-synchronous interhemispheric termination of the last glacial maximum in mid-latitudes". Science. 312 (5779): 1510–13. Bibcode:2006Sci...312.1510S. doi:10.1126/science.1122872. PMID 16763146. S2CID 8225301.
- Schaefer, J.M.; Denton, G.H.; Kaplan, M.; Putnam, A.; Finkel, R.C.; Barrell, D.J.A.; Andersen, B.G.; Schwartz, R.; Mackintosh, A.; Chinn, T.; Schlüchter, C. (2009). "High-Frequency Holocene Glacier Fluctuations, New Zealand Differ from the Northern Signature". Science. 324 (5927): 622–25. Bibcode:2009Sci...324..622S. doi:10.1126/science.1169312. PMID 19407198. S2CID 42957440.

=== Books ===
- B. G. Andersen and L.-K. Königsson (eds.), 1991: Late Quaternary Stratigraphy in the Nordic Countries 150,000–15,000 B.P.: the XXIV Uppsala Symposium in Quaternary Geology. Striae 34. Uppsala : Societas Upsaliensis Pro Geologia Quaternaria. ISBN 978-91-7388-067-1
- Bjørn G. Andersen and Harold W. Borns Jr., 1997: The Ice Age World: an introduction to quaternary history and research with emphasis on North America and Northern Europe during the last 2.5 million years. Oslo: Universitetsforlaget. ISBN 978-82-00-21810-4
- Bjørn G. Andersen, 2000: Ice age Norway: landscapes formed by ice age glaciers. Oslo: Universitetsforlaget. ISBN 978-82-00-45366-6
