= Geographia Polonica =

- Discipline: Geography
- Language: English, Polish

Publication details
- History: 1964–present
- Publisher: Taylor & Francis on behalf of the Royal Danish Geographical Society (Poland)
- Frequency: Quarterly
- Impact factor: (2016)

Standard abbreviations
- ISO 4: Geogr. Pol.

Indexing
- ISSN: 0016-7282 (print); 2300-7362 (web)

Links
- Journal homepage; Online access; Archive

Geographia Polonica is a peer-reviewed scientific journal published by the Institute of Geography and Spatial Organisation of the Polish Academy of Sciences. The journal is subsidized by the Ministry of Science and Higher Education of Poland.

== See also ==
- Fennia
- Geografiska Annaler
- Danish Journal of Geography
- Norwegian Journal of Geography
