= Jökull (journal) =

- Discipline: Geosciences
- Language: Icelandic and English
- Edited by: Bryndís Brandsdóttir

Publication details
- History: 1951–present
- Publisher: Iceland Glaciological Society, Geoscience Society of Iceland (Iceland)
- Frequency: Annual
- Impact factor: 1.342 (2017)

Standard abbreviations
- ISO 4: Jökull

Indexing
- ISSN: 0449-0576

Links
- Journal homepage; Online archive

Jökull: The Icelandic Journal of Earth Sciences (Icelandic pronunciation: [ˈjœːkʏtl̥]) is an annual peer-reviewed scientific journal published jointly by the Iceland Glaciological Society and the Geoscience Society of Iceland. The journal covers all aspects of earth sciences in relation to Iceland, including meteorology, oceanography, petrology, and geothermal research. The editor-in-chief is Bryndís Brandsdóttir. It has been classified as "Level 1" journal in the Norwegian Scientific Index.

It was founded in 1950 by Icelandic meteorologist Jón Eyþórsson, who served as its editor until his death in 1968, publishing regular measurements of glacial margins and drift ice in Jökull. These reports have continued, creating a valuable resource for climate scientists.

Jökull has been a victim of journal hijacking.

== See also ==
- Danish Journal of Geography
- Fennia
- Geografiska Annaler
- Geological Survey of Denmark and Greenland Bulletin
- Norwegian Journal of Geography
- Norwegian Journal of Geology
