= Reusch (disambiguation) =

Reusch is a German-language surname.

Reusch may also refer to:

- Reusch (company), a sportswear manufacturing company
- Reusch Glacier, in Antarctica
- Reusch Medal, Norwegian award
- Reusch's Moraine, diamictite in Norway

== See also ==
- Ruesch, surname
