= Jan Mangerud =

Norwegian geologist

- Born: 29 November 1937 (age 88); Oslo, Norway
- Spouse: Bjørg Mangerud
- Scientific career
- Fields: Quaternary geology, paleoclimatology
- Institutions: University of Colorado; University of Bergen
- Doctoral advisor: Bjørn G. Andersen

Jan Mangerud (born 29 November 1937 in Oslo) is a Norwegian geologist who grew up in Lillestrøm, Akershus, and currently lives in Rådal, Bergen.

== Scientific career ==
Mangerud graduated from the University of Oslo with a Bachelor's degree (cand.mag.) in 1961 and a master's degree (cand.real.) in 1962, and in 1973 he obtained a Doctorate (dr. philos.) from the University of Bergen, where he started a long lasting cooperation with Professor Bjørn G. Andersen, becoming a professor at the same university in 1977. He is also connected to the University of Bergen's Bjerknes Centre for Climate Research, now as Professor emeritus (2013).

Mangerud was a visiting scholar at Stockholm University in 1965 and the University of Minnesota in 1972, and a visiting professor at the Institute of Arctic and Alpine Research, University of Colorado on several occasions. He has been involved in supervising research activities at the Norwegian Research Council for Science and the Humanities and the Research Council of Norway, and his own publications in academic journals number about 160.

Mangerud became a member of the Royal Norwegian Society of Sciences and Letters in 1987, the Norwegian Academy of Science and Letters in 1992, the Royal Swedish Physiographic Society in 1996, and the Academia Europaea in 1991. He was the first Norwegian to become an honorary member of the Quaternary Research Association, in 2006, and the International Union for Quaternary Research, in 2007. He has won several prizes for his research, including the Reusch Medal in 1971 and the Brøgger Prize in 2005.

Childlike curiosity and enthusiasm characterize Mangerud, and when he resigned as professor at the University of Bergen in 2005, he knew that it was precisely these qualities that were the key to his success as a researcher.

== Honors ==
- 1962 – Hans and Helga Reuschs Legacy
- 1971 – The Reusch Medal from the Norwegian Geological Society
- 1987 – Member of the Royal Norwegian Society of Sciences and Letters
- 1991 – Member of Academia Europaea
- 1992 – Member of the Norwegian Academy of Science and Letters
- 1995 – The Fram Committee's Nansen Reward
- 1996 – Member of Royal Physiographic Society in Lund, Sweden
- 2005 – Brøgger Prize from the Norwegian Geological Society
- 2006 – Honorary member of the Quaternary Research Association (QRA)
- 2007 – Honorary member of International Union for Quaternary Research (INQUA)
