= Motherby =

Motherby is a surname, and may refer to:

- George Motherby (bapt. 1731 – 1793), English physician and medical writer
- Robert Motherby (1736–1801), English merchant in East Prussia, brother of George Motherby
- William Motherby (1776–1847), physician, son of Robert Motherby
