= Knut Olai Bjørlykke =

Norwegian geologist and sedimentologist

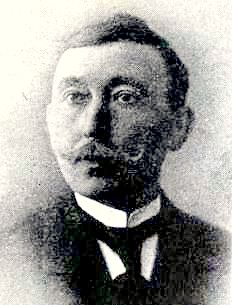
Knut Bjørlykke

Knut Olai Knutsen Bjørlykke (11 February 1860 – 26 February 1946) was a Norwegian geologist and sedimentologist.

He was born on Sandøya in Romsdalen county, Norway. He was the father of Harald Bjørlykke and through him a grandfather of Arne Bjørlykke.

He took the dr.philos. degree in 1907 and his best known academic work was Det centrale Norges fjeldbygning (1905). He worked for the Norwegian Geological Survey from 1889 to 1905 and the Norwegian College of Agriculture from 1898 to 1931. He was awarded his PhD. in 1907 and appointed professor of geology.

In the 1915 Norwegian parliamentary election, he stood as a candidate for the Liberal Party in the constituency Bærum og Follo but lost to Christian Fredrik Michelet with only 864 out of 9,133 votes.

The Bjørlykke Glacier in Svalbard was named after him following a proposal in 1912 by Adolf Hoel, who had traversed the glacier in 1909 together with Olaf Holtedahl.
