= Harald Bjørlykke =

Norwegian geologist

- Born: 14 September 1901; Ås, Norway
- Died: 28 February 1968 (aged 66)
- Education: University of Oslo
- Children: Arne Bjørlykke
- Awards: Reusch Medal
- Scientific career
- Fields: geology
- Workplaces: Norwegian Institute of Technology; Geological Survey of Norway; Norsk Bergverk; Søve mines

Harald Bjørlykke (14 September 1901 – 28 February 1968) was a Norwegian geologist.

== Biography ==
He was born in Ås in Akershus, Norway. He was a son of Knut Olai Bjørlykke, who was a professor of geology at Ås. He was the father of geologist Arne Bjørlykke.

He took the dr.philos. degree from the University of Oslo in 1935. From 1937 to 1946 he was a lecturer in mineralogy and crystallography at Norwegian Institute of Technology. He was a state geologist at the Geological Survey of Norway 1946–1951. He became head of Norsk Bergverk in 1952 and was chief geologist at Søve mines in Ulefoss. In 1958, he became director of the Norwegian Geological Survey. He was professor of geology at the Norwegian Institute of Technology from 1966.

Bjørlykke received the Reusch Medal (Reusch-Medaljen) from the Norwegian Geological Society in 1939. He died during 1968 at Trondheim.
