= Strandflat =

Type of landform found in high-latitude areas

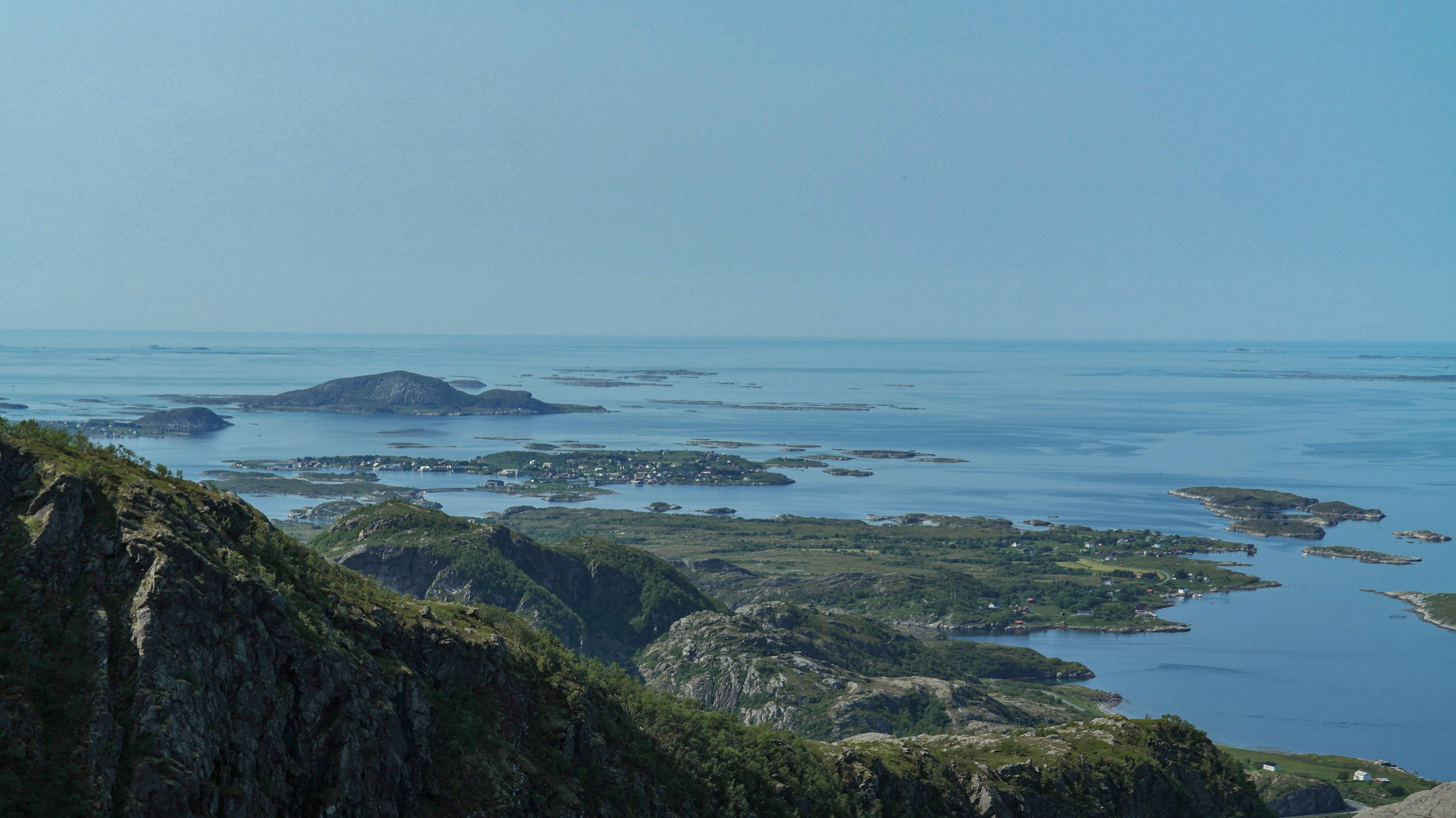
Strandflat at Herøy Municipality, northern Norway

Strandflat (Norwegian: strandflate) is a landform typical of the Norwegian coast consisting of a flattish erosion surface on the coast and near-coast seabed. In Norway, strandflats provide room for settlements and agriculture, constituting important cultural landscapes. The shallow and protected waters of strandflats are valued fishing grounds that provide sustenance to traditional fishing settlements. Outside Norway proper, strandflats can be found in other high-latitude areas, such as Antarctica, Alaska, the Canadian Arctic, the Russian Far North, Greenland, Svalbard, Sweden, and Scotland.

The strandflats are usually bounded on the landward side by a sharp break in slope, leading to mountainous terrain or high plateaux. On the seaward side, strandflats end at submarine slopes. The bedrock surface of strandflats is uneven and tilts gently towards the sea.

The concept of a strandflat was introduced in 1894 by Norwegian geologist Hans Reusch.

== Norwegian strandflat ==
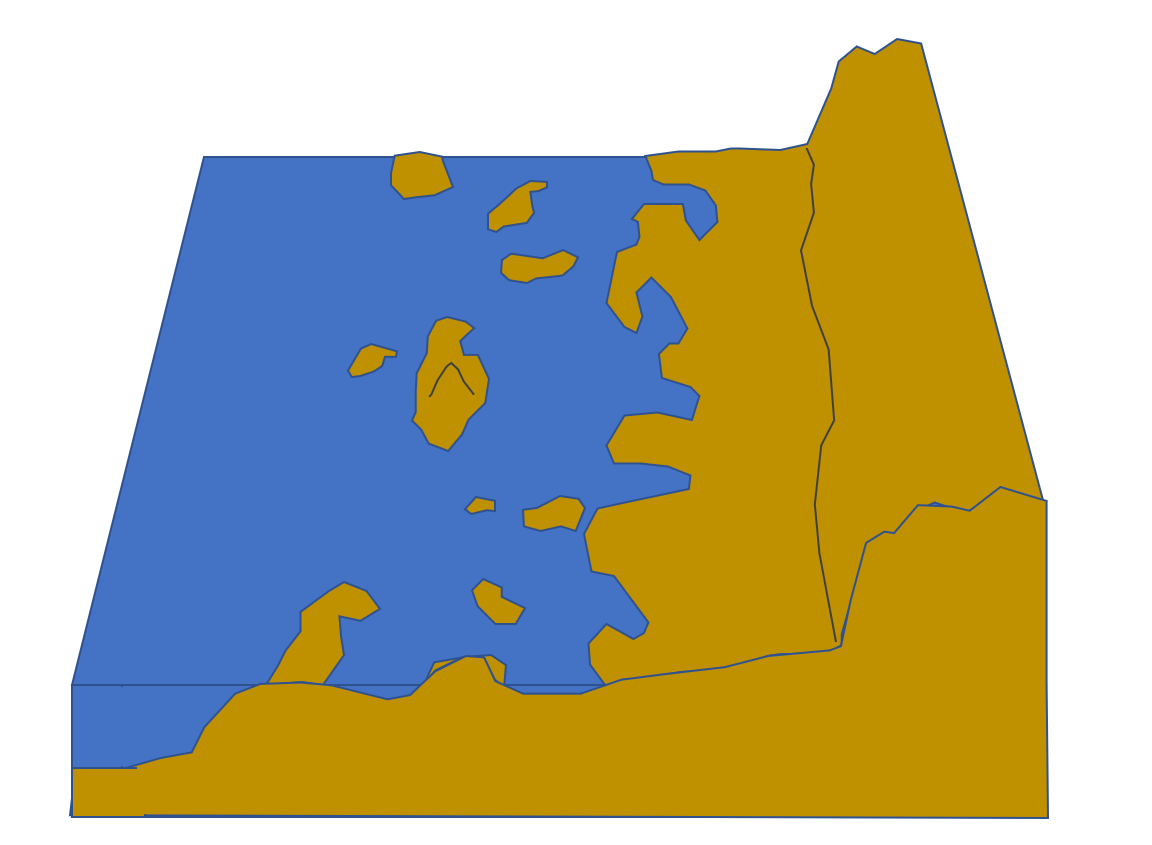
Schematic profile of a strandflat in Norway. To the right lies higher terrain, to the left lies a steep slope leading to the strandflat. The strandflat is both flat and undulating, and contains a skerry zone to the left. The skerries are separated from the submarine flat surfaces of the bankflat by an underwater slope. The large island in the middle hosts a rauk.

=== Characteristics ===
Strandflats are not fully flat and may display some local relief, meaning that it is usually not possible to assign them a precise elevation above sea level. The Norwegian strandflats may go from 70–60 metres (230–200 ft) above sea level to 40–30 metres (131–98 ft) below sea level. The undulations in the strandflat relief may result in an irregular coastline with skerries, small embayments, and peninsulas.

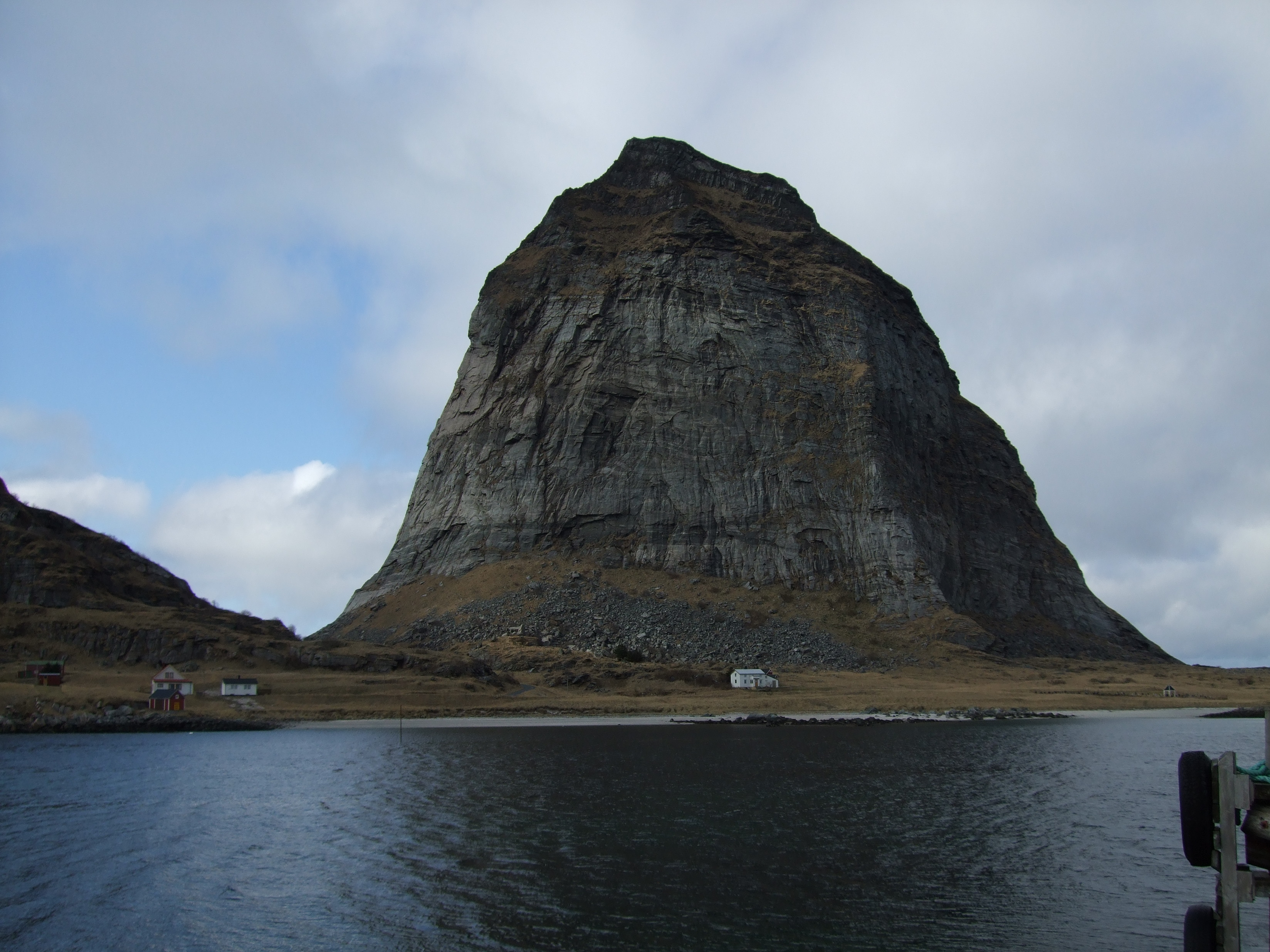
The mountain Trænstaven in Træna Municipality is a rauk amidst the strandflat of Norway's coast.

The width of the strandflat varies from 1–50 kilometres (0.62–31.07 mi) and occasionally reaching up to 80 kilometres (50 mi) in width. From land to sea the strandflat can be subdivided into the following zones: the supramarine zone, the skjærgård (skerry archipelago), and the submarine zone. Residual mountains surrounded by the strandflat are called rauks.

On the landward side, the strandflat often terminates abruptly with the beginning of a steep slope that separates it from higher or more uneven terrain. In some locations this sharp boundary is lacking and the landward end of strandflat is diffuse. On the seaward side, the strandflat continues underwater down to depths of 30 to 60 metres (98 to 197 ft), where a steep submarine slope separates it from older low relief paleic surfaces. These paleic surfaces are known as bankflat, and make up much of the continental shelf. At some locations, the landward end of the strandflat or the region slightly above contains relict sea caves partly filled with sediments that predate the last glacial period. These caves lie near the post-glacial marine limit or above it.

Overall, strandflats in Nordland county are larger and flatter than those of Western Norway. Also in Nordland, many strandflats are found next to active seismic faults.

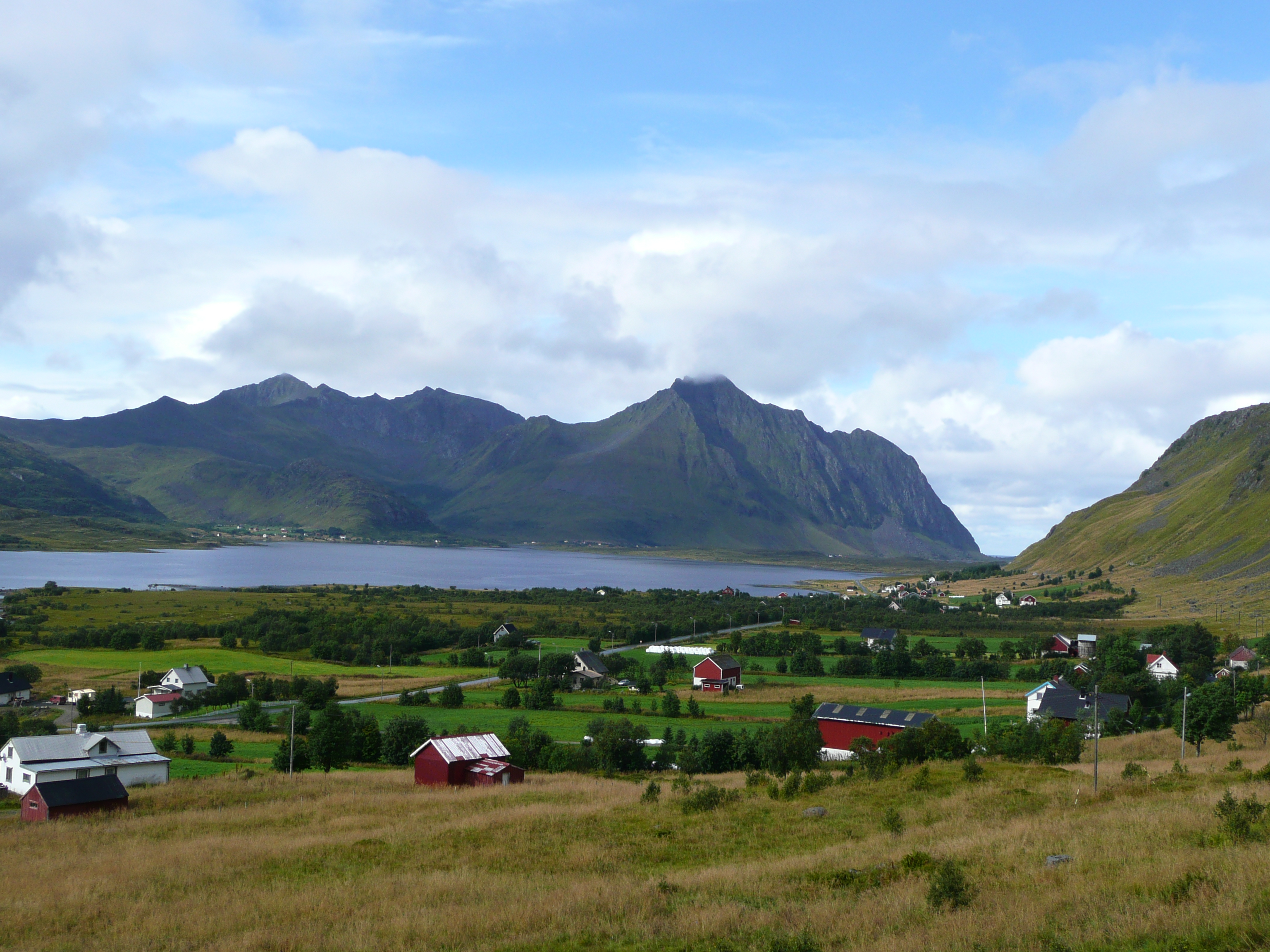
Farms at the strandflat of Lofotfjella at Eggum in Vestvågøy Municipality

=== Geological origin ===
Despite being together with fjords the most studied coastal landform in Norway, as of 2013 there is no consensus as to the origin of strandflats. An analysis of the literature shows that during the course of the 20th century, explanations for the strandflat shifted from involving one or two processes to including many more. Thus most modern explanations are of polygenetic type. Grand-scale observations on the distribution of strandflats tend to favour an origin in connection to the Quaternary glaciations, while in-detail studies have led scholars to argue that strandflats have been shaped by chemical weathering during the Mesozoic. According to this second view, the weathered surface would then have been buried in sediments to be freed from this cover during Late Neogene for a final reshaping by erosion. Hans Holtedahl regarded the strandflats as modified paleic surfaces, conjecturing that paleic surfaces dipping gently to the sea would favoured strandflat formation.

In his original description, Reusch regarded the strandflat as originating from marine abrasion prior to glaciation, (Note: American geographers William Morris Davis and Douglas Wilson Johnson supported the view that marine erosion created the strandflat.) but adding that some levelling could have been caused by non-marine erosion. In his view, the formation of the strandflat preceded the fjords of Norway. Years later, in 1919, Hans Ahlmann assumed the strandflat formed by erosion on land towards a base level. In the mid-20th century, W. Evers argued in a series of publications that the strandflat was a low-erosion surface formed on land as part of a stepped sequence (piedmonttreppen) that included the Paleic surfaces. This idea was refuted by Olaf Holtedahl, who noted that the position of the surfaces were not that of a piedmonttreppen. (Note: Later in 2000 Karna Lidmar-Bergström, Cliff Ollier and Jan R. Sulebak did describe the Paleic surface as composed of a sequence of steps but did so only for the upper parts.)

==== Frost weathering, glaciers and sea ice ====
The Arctic explorer Fritjof Nansen agreed with Reusch that marine influences formed the strandflat, but added in 1922 that frost weathering was also of key importance. Nansen discarded ordinary marine abrasion as an explanation for the formation of the strandflat, as he noted that much of the strandflat lay in areas protected from major waves. In his analysis, Nansen argued that the strandflat formed after the fjords of Norway had dissected the landscape. This, he argued, facilitated marine erosion by creating more coast and by creating nearby sediment sinks for eroded material.

In 1929, Olaf Holtedahl favoured a glacial origin for the strandflat, an idea that was picked up by his son Hans Holtedahl. Hans Holtedahl and E. Larsen went on to argue in 1985 for an origin in connection to the Quaternary glaciations with material loosened by frost weathering, and sea-ice transporting loose material and making the relief flat. Tormod Klemsdal added in 1982 that cirque glaciers could have made minor contributions in "widening, levelling and splitting the strandflat". (Note: Cirques in the southern half of Norway can be found both near sea level and at elevations up to 2,000 metres (6,600 ft).)

==== Deep weathering and antiquity ====
Contrary to the glacial and periglacial hypotheses, Julius Büdel and Jean-Pierre Peulvast regard weathering of rock into saprolite as important in shaping the strandflat. Büdel held that weathering took place in a distant past with tropical and sub-tropical climates, while Peulvast considered that present-day conditions and a lack of glaciation were enough to produce the weathering. As such, Peulvast considered the saprolite found in the strandflat, and the weathering that produced it, to predate the Last glacial period and possibly the Quaternary glaciations. For Büdel, the strandflat was a surface shaped by weathering dotted with inselbergs.

In 2013, Odleiv and co-workers put forward a mixed origin for the strandflat of Nordland. They argue that this strandflat in northern Norway could represent the remnants of a weathered peneplain of Triassic age (Note: Remnants of a peneplain formed in Triassic times do also exist in southwestern Sweden.) that was buried in sediment for long time before made flat again by erosion in Pliocene and Pleistocene times. A 2017 study concerning radiometric dating of illite, a clay formed by weathering, is interpreted to indicate that the strandflat at Bømlo in Western Norway was weathered c. 210 million years ago during Late Triassic times. Haakon Fossen and co-workers disagree with this view citing thermochronology studies to claim that the strandflat in Western Norway was still covered by sedimentary rock in the Triassic and did only got free of its sedimentary cover in the Jurassic. Same authors note that movement of geological faults in the Late Mesozoic imply the strandflats of Western Norway took their final shape after the Late Jurassic or else they would occur at various heights above sea level. A similar opinion is expressed by Hans Holtedahl who wrote that "[t]he strandflat must have formed later the main (Tertiary) uplift of the Scandinavian landmass". To this Holtedahl added that in Trøndelag between Nordland and Western Norway the strandflat could be a surface formed before the Jurassic, then buried in sediments and at some point freed from this cover. In the understanding of Tormod Klemsdal strandflats may be old surfaces shaped by deep weathering that escaped the uplift that affected the Scandinavian Mountains further east.

The strandflat at Bømlo is considered by Ola Fredin and co-workers to be equivalent to the sediment-capped top of Utsira High offshore west of Stavanger. This view is also disputed by Haakon Fossen and co-workers who state that the basement surface under the northern North Sea formed not at a single time.

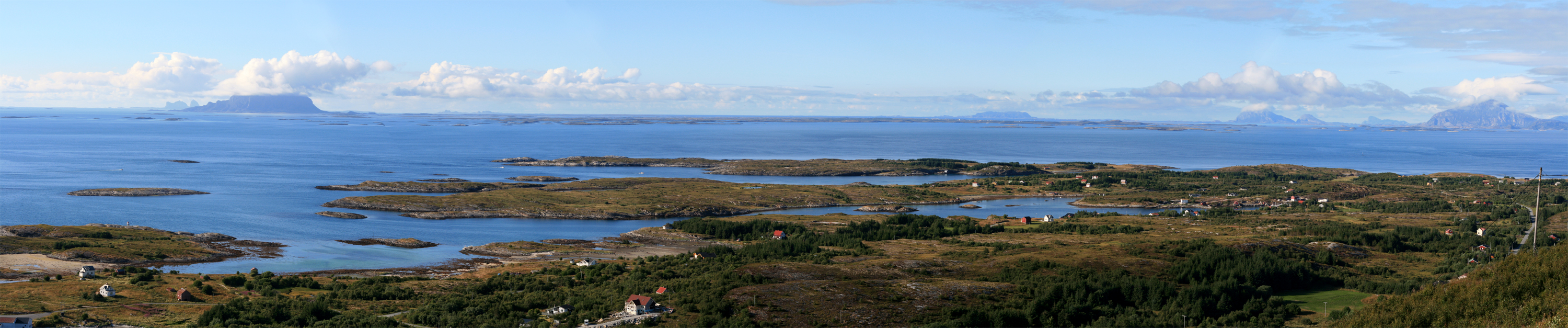
View of the strandflat at Helgeland from the mountain Dønnesfjellet in Dønna. A number of rauks can be seen, from left: Træna, Lovunda, Selvær, Nesøya, Hestmona, Rødøyløva, and Lurøyfjellet, all landmarks on the Norwegian coast.

== Outside Norway ==
Strandflats have been identified in high-latitude areas such as the coast of Alaska, Arctic Canada, Greenland, Svalbard, Novaya Zemlya and Taymyr Peninsula in Russia and the western coasts of Sweden and Scotland. These strandflats are usually smaller than those in Norway.

In Antarctica, strandflats can be found in the Antarctic Peninsula as well as in the South Shetland Islands. In addition there have been mentions of strandflats in South Georgia Island.

In Robert Island in the South Shetland Islands, raised strandflats show that the island has been subject to a relative change in sea level. Raised shore platforms corresponding to strandflats have also been identified in Scotland's Hebrides. Possibly these formed in Pliocene times and were later modified by the Quaternary glaciations.

== Gallery ==
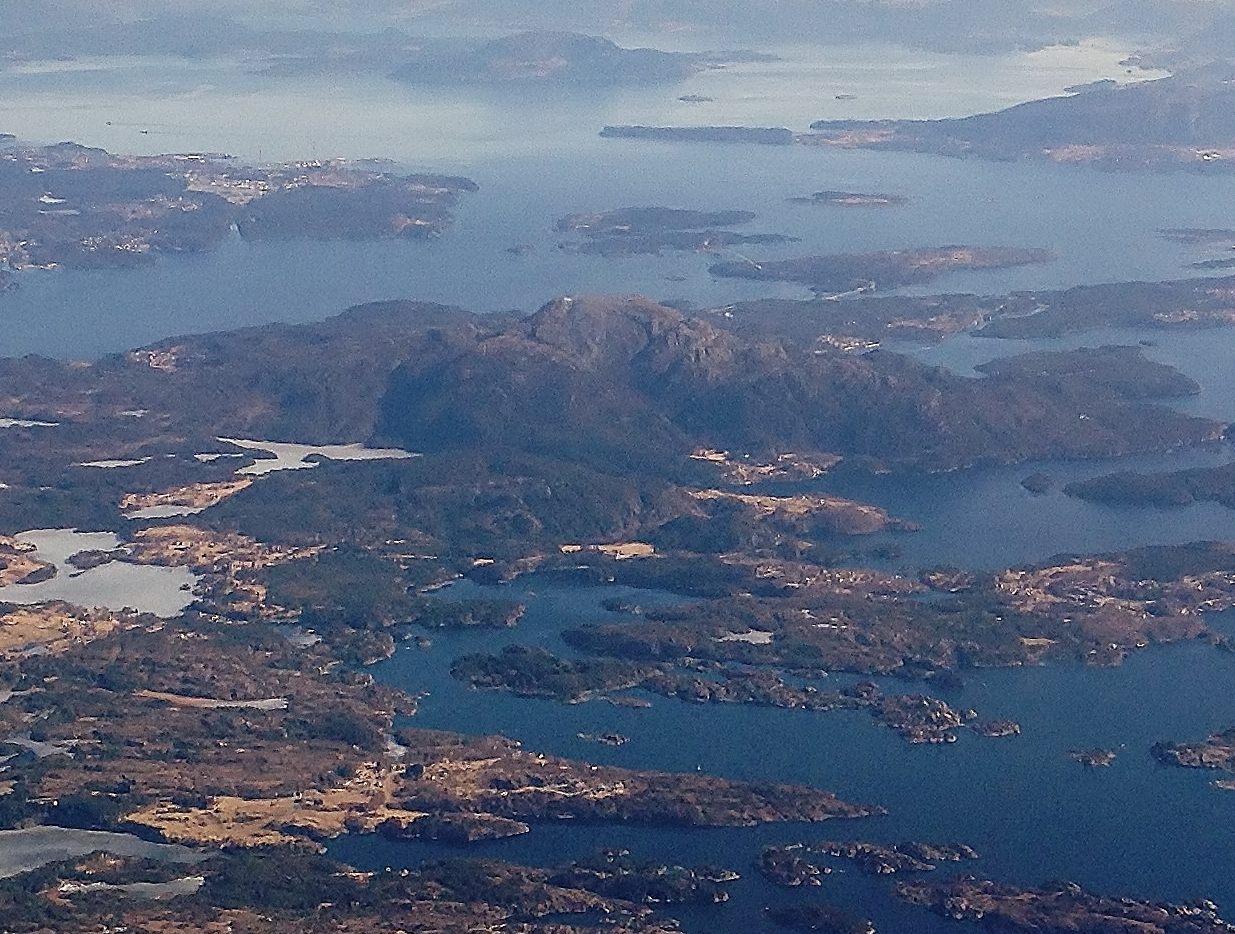
Aerial view of the strandflat at Bømlo

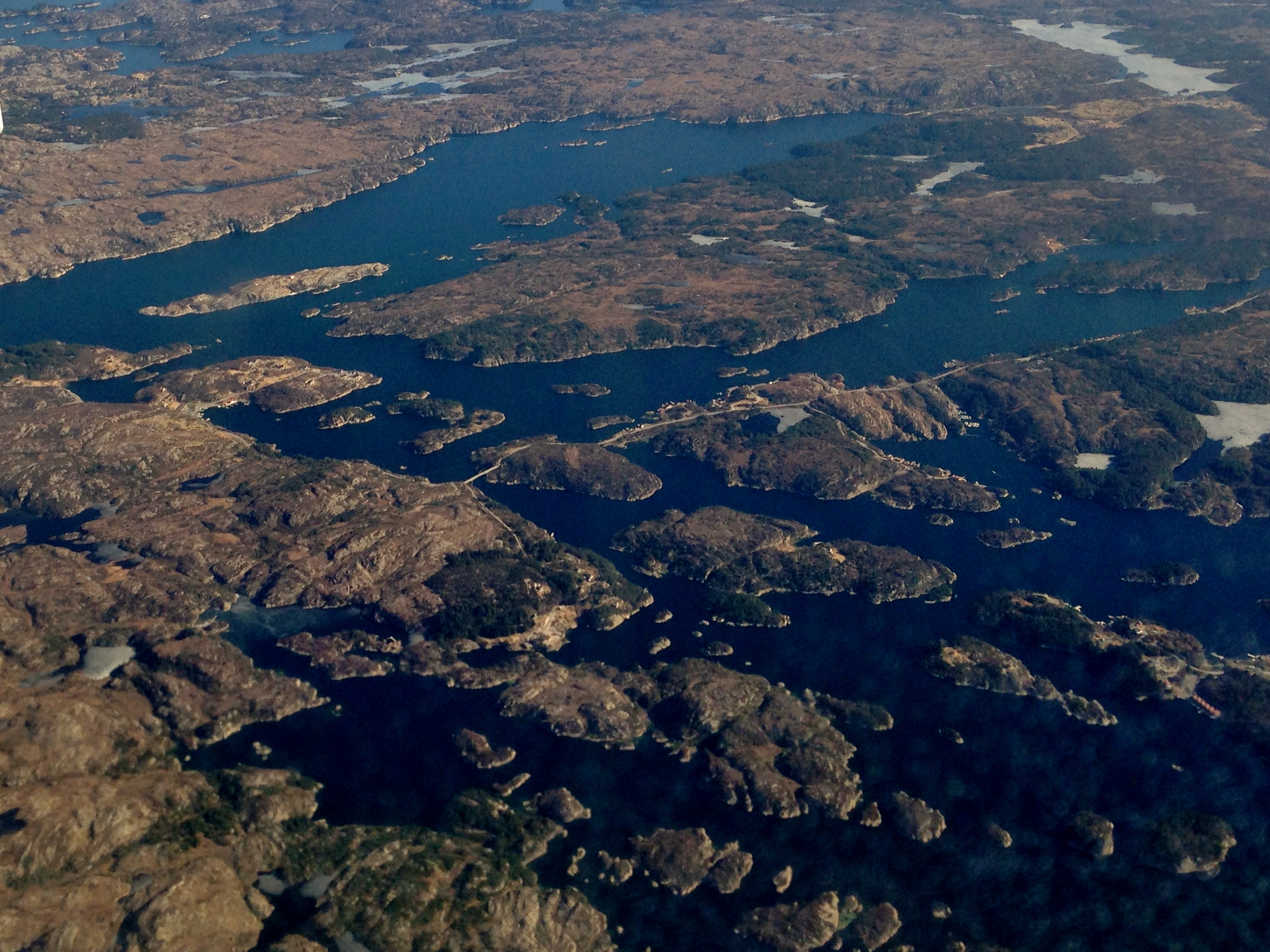
Aerial view of the strandflat at Goddo island near Bømlo

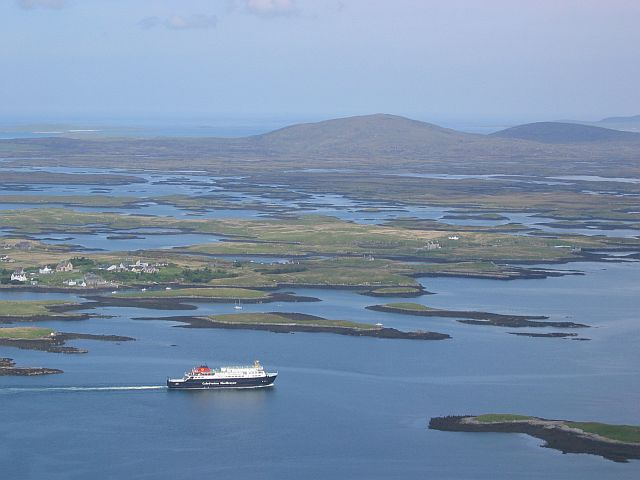
Skerry zone of a strandflat in Lochmaddy, Hebrides
