= Henningsmoen =

Henningsmoen is a Norwegian surname. Notable people with the surname include:

- Gunnar Henningsmoen (1919–1996), Norwegian palaeontologist, son of Nils
- Nils H. Henningsmoen (1894–1983), Norwegian military officer
