= Reusch =

Reusch is a surname. Notable people with the surname include:

- Christian Friedrich Reusch (1778–1848), East Prussian administrative lawyer
- Franz Heinrich Reusch (1825–1900), German theologian
- Friedrich Reusch (1843–1906), German sculptor
- Hans Henrik Reusch (1852–1922), Norwegian geologist
- Helga Marie Ring Reusch (1865–1944), Norwegian artist
- Kina Reusch (1940–1988), Canadian artist
- Michael Reusch (1914–1989), Swiss gymnast
- Roman Reusch (born 1954), German politician
- Ron Reusch, Canadian sports broadcaster

== See also ==
- Ruesch, surname
