= Atle Rotevatn =

Norwegian geologist (born 1976)

Atle Rotevatn (born 1976 in Norway) is a professor of geology at the University of Bergen in Norway. In 2011, he received the Reusch Medal from the Norwegian Geological Society. And in 2018, he received the Olav Thon national award for excellence in teaching.
