= Danish Journal of Geography =

Peer-reviewed scientific journal

- Discipline: Geography
- Language: English, Danish

Publication details
- Former name(s): Geografisk Tidsskrift
- History: 1902-present
- Publisher: Routledge on behalf of the Royal Danish Geographical Society (Denmark)
- Frequency: Biannual
- Open access: Hybrid
- Impact factor: 2.320 (2021)

Standard abbreviations
- ISO 4: Dan. J. Geogr.

Indexing
- ISSN: 0016-7223 (print); 1903-2471 (web)

Links
- Journal homepage; Online access; Online archive

Danish Journal of Geography (Danish: Geografisk Tidsskrift) is a peer-reviewed scientific journal published by Routledge on behalf of the Royal Danish Geographical Society.

== See also ==
- Fennia
- Geografiska Annaler
- Jökull
- Norwegian Journal of Geography
