= Norwegian Journal of Geology =

Academic journal

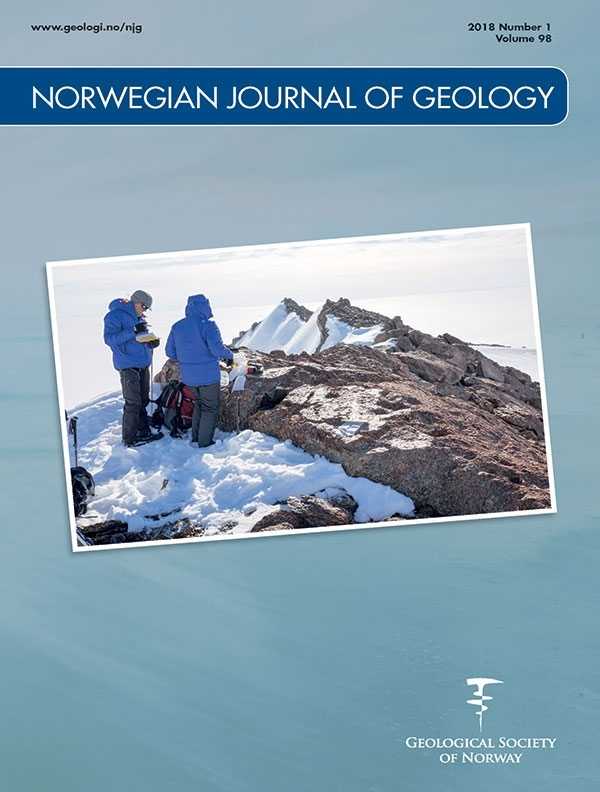
- Discipline: Geology
- Language: English, Norwegian

Publication details
- History: 1905
- Publisher: Norwegian Geological Society (Norway)
- Frequency: Quarterly
- Open access: Yes
- License: Creative Commons Attribution 4.0 International License
- Impact factor: 1.765 (2018)

Standard abbreviations
- ISO 4: Nor. J. Geol.

Indexing
- ISSN: 0029-196X (print); 0801-4736 (web)

Links
- Journal homepage

Norwegian Journal of Geology (Norwegian: Norsk Geologisk Tidsskrift) is a quarterly peer-reviewed scientific journal published by the Norwegian Geological Society. The scope of the journal is the geology of Norway, the Arctic, and nearby seas. The journal adopted the Creative Commons Attribution License for published works since volume 94, issue 4 (2014). It is a member of the Free Journal Network.

== Abstracting and indexing ==
The journal is abstracted and indexed in:

- Scopus
- Science Citation Index Expanded
- Science Citation Index
- Current Contents: Physical, Chemical & Earth Sciences
- Essential Science Indicators
- Zoological Record
- GEOBASE
- GeoRef

== See also ==
- Fennia
- Geografiska Annaler
- Norwegian Journal of Geography
