= Thurandina =

Thurandina Temporal range: Devonian

Scientific classification
- Kingdom: Animalia
- Phylum: Arthropoda
- Clade: Arachnomorpha
- Subphylum: Chelicerata
- Clade: Euchelicerata (?)
- Genus: †Thurandina; Størmer, 1974

Type species
- †Thurandina waterstoni Størmer, 1974

Extinct genus of arthropods

Thurandina is a Devonian genus from Alken, Germany. It was initially described by Leif Størmer as a chelicerate arthropod possibly belonging to the order Eurypterida. Nowadays, it is classified as incertae sedis inside Euchelicerata.
