= Hans Holtedahl =

Norwegian geologist (1917–2001)

- Born: 8 December 1917; Kristiania, Norway
- Died: 24 February 2001 (aged 83); Bergen
- Occupation: Geologist
- Employer: University of Bergen
- Father: Olaf Holtedahl
- Awards: Reusch Medal (1952)

Hans Holtedahl (8 December 1917 – 24 February 2001) was a Norwegian geologist. He was a professor of geology at the University of Bergen.

== Biography ==
He was born in Krisitania (now Oslo, Norway) a son of geologist Olaf Holtedahl (1885–1975) and Tora Gurstad (1889–1980).

In 1936, Holtedahl began studying chemistry and zoology at the University of Oslo. In 1939, he joined a research expedition to Antarctica. Following the German occupation of Norway during spring 1940, he went to Great Britain. He became part of a Norwegian field unit in support of the Free Norwegian forces. Given six months leave in Edinburgh, he studied geology under geologist Arthur Holmes (1890–1965) at the University of Edinburgh.

In 1948 he took a master's degree at the University of Oslo and in 1957 he received his doctorate from the University of Bergen. He worked for the University of Bergen from 1949, and was appointed professor of Quaternary geology from 1967, and professor of marine geology from 1972. His doctor thesis treated the geomorphology and sediments on the continental shelf off the coast of Møre. He published a work on the geology of the Hardangerfjord in 1975. In 1952, Hans Holtedahl was honored by the Norwegian Geological Society with the Reusch Medal.

== Personal life ==
During his studies in Edinburgh, he met the philology student Wendy Moira Lowe (1923–1978), who he married in 1946 and with whom he had three children.
