= Leif Størmer =

Norwegian paleontologist and geologist

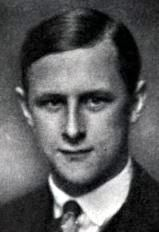
- Størmer in 1933
- Born: July 1, 1905; Kristiania, Norway
- Died: May 15, 1979 (aged 73); Oslo, Norway
- Education: University of Oslo
- Spouse: Ingegerd Wiborg Alten
- Awards: Order of St. Olav, Defence Medal 1940–1945, Reusch Medal, Nansen Prize

Leif Størmer (1 July 1905 – 15 May 1979) was a Norwegian paleontologist and geologist. He was professor of historical geology at the University of Oslo from 1946 to 1975. His father was the mathematician Carl Størmer, and his son the mathematician Erling Størmer.

== Early life and education ==
Størmer was born in Kristiania (now Oslo) to Fredrik Carl Mülertz Størmer (1874–1957) and Adelaide Clauson (1877–1973). His brother Per Størmer (1907–1991) became a botanist. His sister Henny married landowner Carl Otto Løvenskiold.

Leif Størmer attended school in Kristiania, and became interested in paleontology and geology. In 1923, he took his examen artium, and studied thereafter at the University of Oslo. He graduated with the cand.mag. degree in 1928, then the dr.philos. degree in 1931. In 1931–32, Størmer resided in the United States with a Rockefeller Foundation grant. On 23 May 1932, he married Ingegerd ("Tutti") Wiborg Alten (1912–2009) in New York.

== Career ==
In 1930, Størmer was employed as a conservator vicar at the Museum of Paleontology in Oslo. One year later, he took his dissertation Skandinaviske Trinucleidae, which introduced numerous publications on the construction, nature and development of the trilobite. From 1932 to 1937, he was a research fellow, thereupon assistant, and in 1940 conservator at the Museum of Paleontology. From 1940 to 1941 he chaired the Geological Society of Norway. During the Second World War, Størmer participated in the Norwegian resistance movement as a treasurer for Milorg.

In 1946, he was appointed professor of historical geology at the University of Oslo. From 1957 to 1959, he was dean at the university's Faculty of Mathematics and Natural Sciences. Størmer authored about 70 publications on paleontology and geology in his life. He also wrote a few popular science articles for different Norwegian magazines. In 1940, he became a member of the Norwegian Academy of Science and Letters. Størmer was concerned about communicating his knowledge in a popular scientific way. He was one amongst three editors of the fourth edition of the popular encyclopedia Aschehougs konversasjonsleksikon and published in 1966 a textbook titled Jorden og livets historie ("The History of the Earth and Life").

Størmer also had positions in several Norwegian and international organisations in science after the war. He was notably a board member of the International Paleontological Union and of the International Geological Union. From 1960 to 1965, he headed the International Stratigraphy Commission. He participated in Statens lønnskommisjon av 1946 ("The State's Wage Commission of 1946") and in the committee that prepared the Norwegian law of nature conservation (1956). He was also involved in the insurance business as a supervisory council member of Forsikringsselskapet Norden.

In 1961, he was decorated as Knight, First Class of the Order of St. Olav. He also received the Reusch Medal (1937), the Bergen Price (1945) and the Fridtjof Nansen Price (1965). He died in May 1979 in Oslo, aged 73.

Academic offices
Preceded by	Dean of Faculty of Mathematics and Natural Sciences, University of Oslo; 1957–1959	Succeeded by
