= Knut S. Heier =

Norwegian geochemist (1929–2008)

- Born: 20 April 1929; Bærum
- Died: 14 September 2008 (aged 79)
- Citizenship: Norwegian
- Education: University of Oslo
- Known for: Apollo Project
- Scientific career
- Fields: geochemistry geology petrology mineralogy geophysics
- Workplaces: University of Oslo professor, 1968–1979; Norwegian Institute of Technology professor, 1979–1989; Norwegian Geological Survey director, 1974–1994

Knut Sigurdsøn Heier (20 April 1929 – 14 September 2008) was a Norwegian geochemist. He was a professor at the University of Oslo and the Norwegian Institute of Technology between 1968 and 1989, and was also director of the Norwegian Geological Survey. Heier also spent parts of his research abroad, and was a member of the Apollo Project.

== Education ==
He was born in Bærum Municipality as the son of an engineer. He graduated from the University of Oslo with the cand.real. degree in 1954, with a paper on tungsten. He subsequently turned down a job offer from the private sector to work on a doctoral thesis. He started with a year of field work at Bø i Vesterålen, from 1955, and then went to Oxford to conduct laboratory work. He finally took the dr.philos. degree in 1960. He then did postdoctoral research for two years at Rice University. He was offered a senior fellowship at the Australian National University, but instead returned to Norway.

== Later career ==
He was a professor of geochemistry at the University of Oslo from 1968 to 1979 and in geology at the Norwegian Institute of Technology from 1979 to 1989. In addition to these two fields, he published scientific works in petrology, mineralogy and geophysics—130 works in total. He also participated with neutron activation analysis in the Apollo Project. During his time, Norway was an emerging petroleum power. Heier helped ensure that research positions relevant to petroleum were funded. This has been considered as a necessary renewal of the focus of geology in Norway.

From 1974 to 1994 he presided over the Norwegian Geological Survey. He was also an adjunct professor at the Norwegian University of Science and Technology, and a member of Norway's three learned societies; the Royal Norwegian Society of Sciences and Letters, the Norwegian Academy of Science and Letters and the Norwegian Academy of Technological Sciences. He received the Brøgger Prize, named for Waldemar Christofer Brøgger, in 2007.

Heier was married and had children. They resided at Stabekkåsen. He died in September 2008, at 79 years of age.
