= George Wallis (physician) =

English physician and author

- Born: 1740; York
- Died: 29 January 1802 (aged 61–62); London
- Occupations: Physician and author

George Wallis (1740 – 29 January 1802) was an English physician and author.

== Biography ==
Wallis was born at York in 1740. He studied medicine, and, after gaining the degree of M.D., obtained a large practice at York. He was much attached to theatrical amusements, and besides other pieces composed a mock tragedy entitled ‘Alexander and Statira,’ which was acted at York, Leeds, and Edinburgh. In 1775 a dramatic satire by him, entitled ‘The Mercantile Lovers,’ was acted at York. The play possessed merit enough for success, but it sketched too plainly the foibles of prominent citizens of the town. Through their resentment Wallis lost his entire medical practice, and was obliged to remove to London, where an expurgated edition of the play appeared in the same year. In London he commenced as a lecturer on the theory and practice of physic, and in 1778 published an ‘Essay on the Evil Consequences attending Injudicious Bleeding in Pregnancy’ (London, 1781, 2nd edit. 8vo). He died in London, at Red Lion Square, on 29 January 1802.

Besides the works mentioned, he was the author of:

- ‘The Juvenaliad,’ a satire, 1774, 4to.
- ‘Perjury,’ a satire, 1774, 4to.
- ‘Nosologia Methodica Oculorum, or a Treatise on the Diseases of the Eyes, translated and selected from the Latin of Francis Bossier de Sauvages,’ London, 1785, 8vo.
- ‘The Art of preventing Diseases and restoring Health,’ London, 1793; 2nd edit. 1796; German translation, Berlin, 1800.
- ‘An Essay on the Gout,’ London, 1798, 8vo.

He edited the ‘Works of Thomas Sydenham on Acute and Chronic Diseases,’ London, 1789, 2 vols. 8vo, and the third edition of George Motherby's ‘Medical Dictionary,’ London, 1791, fol.
