= Robert Motherby =

English merchant (born 1736)

Robert Motherby (23 December 1736 – 13 February 1801) was an English merchant based in the Kingdom of Prussia, and a friend of Immanuel Kant.

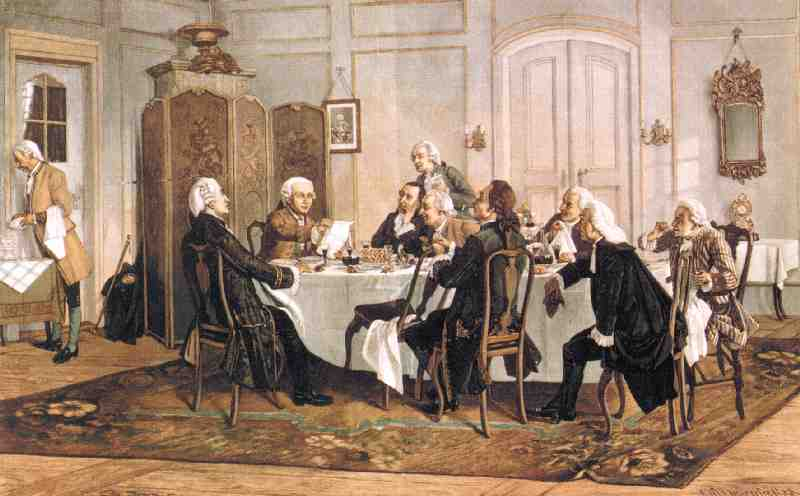
Robert Motherby fourth from the left

== Early life ==
Robert Motherby was born in Kingston upon Hull, the son of George Motherby (born 20 December 1688) and his wife Anne (nee Hotham); the physician George Motherby (died 1793) was his brother. His father died in 1748 when Robert was still young. Robert moved to Kongsberg around 1751, after Joseph Green, a fellow merchant from Hull, was seeking a reliable young Englishman who could become his partner.

Motherby settled well in Konigsberg, despite a lack of German language skills and eventually took over Green, Motherby & Co. completely. In 1762 he married Charlotte Toussaint, a woman from a Huguenot family. She was one of the daughters of Jean Claude Toussaint (1709-1774) and his wife Catherine, originally from France. Jean Claude Toussaint was a co-owner of the trading house Toussaint & Laval.

Charlotte and Robert Motherby had eleven children (six sons and five daughters. One of the sons was the doctor and farmer William Motherby. Robert Motherby died in Königsberg, aged 64.

== Friendship with Kant ==
Immanuel Kant was a regular Sunday guest at Motherby's house; he played and joked with the children and had lunch. For his part, when Kant invited Robert Motherby to lunch, he sent his servant Martin Lampe in the morning with a written billet. Kant attached great importance to this formalism: the invited person should be given the freedom to say no if he did not like it. So this friendship was characterized by respect and respect. Kant trusted him in all financial transactions and invested his savings in profit.
