= William Motherby =

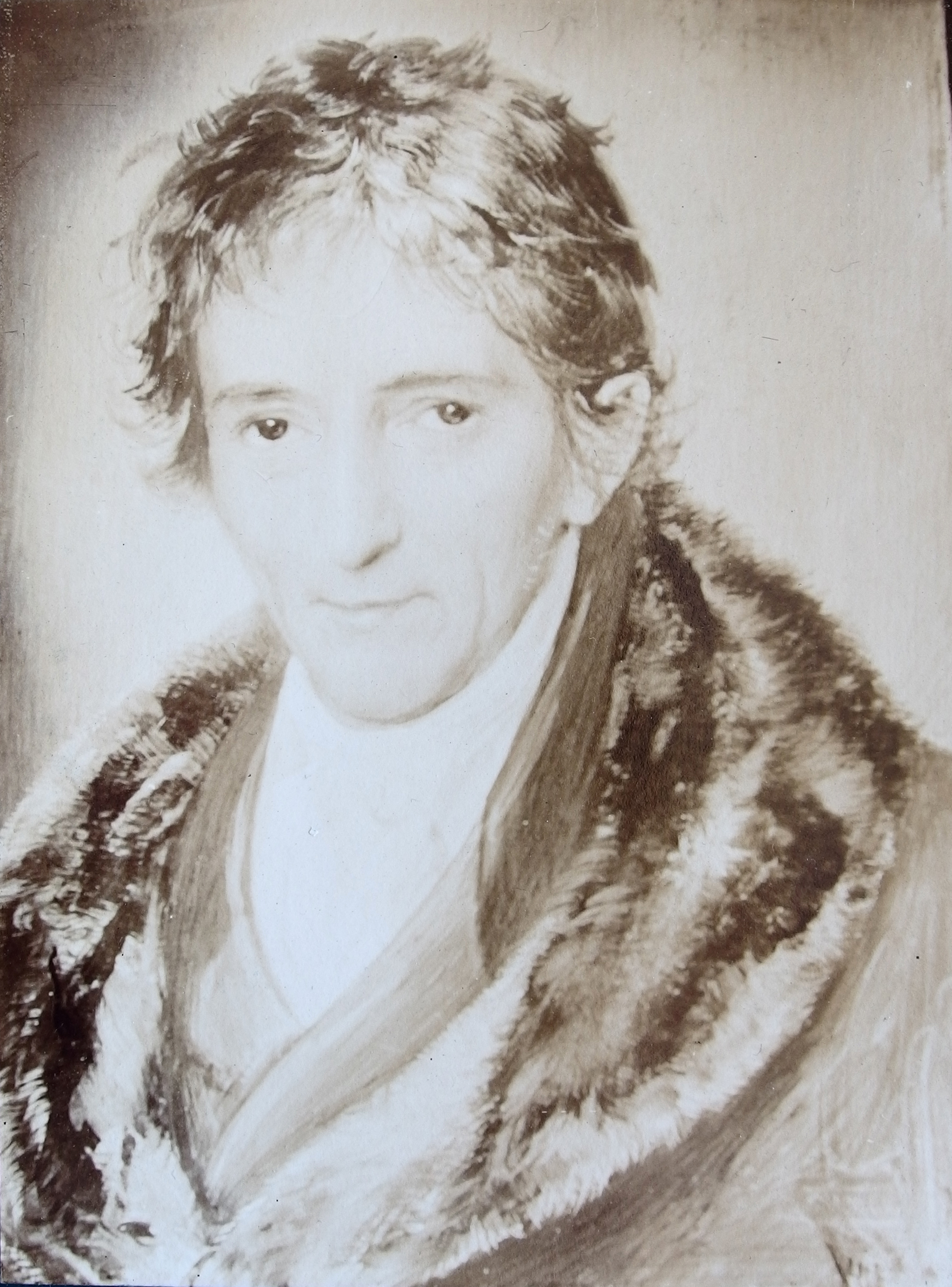
William Motherby

William Motherby (1776–1847) was the originator of the idea of an annual midday meal to celebrate Immanuel Kant on Kant's birthday, which is shared by members of the Society of Kant's Friends on 22 April every year. Until 1944 it was held in Königsberg. After the war it moved to Göttingen and, in 1976, to Mainz. In 2008 the celebration returned to the city now known as Kaliningrad, where it has been held annually since, now attended by Kant's admirers from a number of countries.

== Life ==
William Motherby was born in Königsberg, East Prussia (but after 1945 part of the Soviet Union). He was one of the eleven recorded children of Kant's friend Robert Motherby (1736-1801). His mother, born Charlotte Toussaint (1742-1794), was the daughter of a merchant from Magdeburg. Further back, the Toussaint family had come from France, while Robert Motherby had been born in Yorkshire, England and emigrated in 1751 to Königsberg at the invitation of fellow Yorkshireman Joseph Green who had been looking for a reliable young Englishman to help him with his business.

As a boy William Motherby attended the "progressive" Philanthropinum (school) in Dessau. He then returned to Königsberg where he resolved to study medicine, enrolling at the university on 8 March 1792. He concluded his formal education in Edinburgh where he received his doctorate in 1798. He then returned to Königsberg and established himself as a respected physician. He took a lead on the area over the introduction of cowpox vaccine as a way to prevent smallpox, and contributed to at least two learned papers on the subject.

As William was growing up the Motherby household was becoming the focus of spirited socialising. His circle of friends included several of some of the city's best known intellectuals and literary figures. According to Wilhelm von Humboldt and Ernst Moritz Arndt, the social attributes of William Motherby's young wife, born Johanna Charlotte Tillheim, were an additional attraction. Motherby's own friendship with both Humboldt and Arndt is attested to by the longstanding correspondence between them.

"William was brilliant, bubbling and lovable, full of well timed jokes. .... birth date [back in 1724]"

"William war höchst begabt und liebenswürdig, von sprudelndem, treffendem Witze. Den Gefallen am Etymologisieren schien er von Kant zu haben. Seine Lebhaftigkeit und schnelles Auffassen aller Dinge machten ihn in jeder Gesellschaft beliebt, oft zum Mittelpunkt der Unterhaltung. Ein angesehener Staatsbeamter, aus einem anderen Orte, der ihn in einer Gesellschaft so geistreich sprechen hörte, äußerte sein größtes Gefallen, indem ihm seines Orts dergleichen nicht geboten werde. Die Einführung der Kuhpocken-Impfung suchte Motherby durch kleine Schriften zu befördern, wie er überhaupt das Talent besaß, wenn er es geltend gemacht hätte, durch lebhafte kurze Darstellung Volksschriftsteller zu werden. …… Von Dr. med. William Motherby rührte die schöne Idee her, dass sich die Freunde Kants jährlich zu einem einfachen Mittagessen an seinem Geburtstage, dem 22. April, versammelten."

Christian Friedrich Reusch

"How often he stood out among the dinner companions through the extent of his knowledge and in the swift erudition of his expositions, without ever putting anyone down while delivering his explanations. No one ever felt hurt through his contra-assertions"

"Wie oft er auch im Wissen hoch über den Tischfreunden stand und ihnen in geschickter Durchführung von Behauptungen stets überlegen war, so hat er sicher niemandem wehe getan und wer durch seine Erklärung nicht belehrt, wurde wenigstens niemals durch seinen Widerspruch unangenehm berührt."

Ernst August Hagen

Later, in his 1847 work "Kant und seine Tischgenossen" ("Kant and his dinner companions"), Christian Friedrich Reusch, whose father, the physicist Karl Daniel Reusch had himself been a member of Kant's social circle, recalled that "Dr. med. William Motherby" had been a guest at Kant's house once or twice each week:

"William was brilliant, bubbling and lovable, full of well timed jokes. He seemed to share Kant's delight in Etymology. His lively and quick understanding on every topic made him popular in any social group, and frequently the centre of attention. A distinguished government official from another place who heard Motherby's animated contributions, gave utterance to his regret that there was no one like Motherby back in his own home city. Motherby also promoted the introduction of cowpox vaccine through a succession of written pieces which contributed to his popularity as a writer. It was also from Dr. med. William Motherby that there came the beautiful idea that Kant's friends should meet for a simple lunch each year on 22 April to celebrate the philosopher's birth date [back in 1724]".

Someone else who remembered William Motherby in his own memoires was Ernst August Hagen:

"How often he stood out among the dinner companions through the extent of his knowledge and in the swift erudition of his expositions, without ever putting anyone down while delivering his explanations. No one ever felt hurt through his contra-assertions"

William and Johanna Motherby's own children, Anna (known as "Nancy") and Robert, were born in 1807 and 1808. However, the couple later drifted apart, and were formally divorced in 1822. Two years later Johanna married the physician Johann Friedrich Dieffenbach, although that marriage, too, would end in divorce.

Kant had died early in 1804, and during the final decades of his own life William Motherby increasingly devoted himself to farming. He founded the East Prussian "Association for the Support of Agriculture" ("Verein zur Beförderung der Landwirtschaft"), becoming its director, and producing various papers on agricultural matters. From 1827 or 1832 (sources differ on the year) he held the tenancy on the landed estate at Arnsberg, in the flat countryside to the south of the city. which he farmed with great success, and promoting the nutritional benefits from eating horse meat. He spent the summer months on his estate but still able to spend the winter months in Königsberg. It was only in 1840 that he completely closed down his medical practice in the city.
