= Norwegian Geographical Society =

Norwegian learned society

The Norwegian Geographical Society (in Norwegian: Det norske geografiske Selskab) is a Norwegian learned society founded in 1889. Among the initiators was geologist Hans Henrik Reusch, who chaired the society from 1898 to 1903, and again from 1907 to 1909, and was also an honorary member. In a speech at the society in January 1890 polar researcher Fridtjof Nansen proposed the Fram expedition, an attempt to reach the North Pole, and the building of the polar ship Fram.

The society has published the Norwegian Journal of Geography since 1926.
