= Carl Bugge =

Norwegian geologist

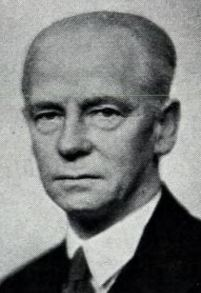
- Born: 13 September 1881; Heddal Municipality, Norway
- Died: 7 April 1968 (aged 86); Oslo, Norway
- Education: University of Oslo
- Occupation: geologist

Carl Bugge (13 September 1881 – 7 April 1968) was a Norwegian geologist.

== Biography ==
Bugge was born at Heddal Municipality in Bratsberg county, Norway. His parents were Johan Carl Bugge (1847–1902) and Theodora Christine Drolsum (1854–1882). His half-brother Arne Bugge became a state geologist. He grew up at Gloppen Municipality in Nordfjord. Bugge started in 1900 at the University of Kristiania and graduated (cand.min.) as a mineralogist in 1903. During 1906 he continued his studies in Hamburg.

He was appointed administrator (myntmester) of the Royal Mint at Kongsberg from 1907 to 1921. In 1918 he became Dr. Philos. on the basis of his doctoral thesis Kongsbergfeltets geologi. He was appointed director-general of the Norwegian Geological Survey for thirty years, from 1921 until his retirement in 1951. In 1954 he published the geological summary work Den kaledonske fjellkjede i Norge.

He was married in 1911 to Catharine Werenskiold (1883–1968), daughter of painter Erik Werenskiold (1855–1938) and Sofie Marie Stoltenberg Thomesen (1849–1926). His son Jens Andreas Werenskiold Bugge (1913–1984) was a professor of Geology at the University of Oslo.
