= Helga Marie Ring Reusch =

Norwegian artist (1865–1944)

- Portrait of the Painter Helga Ring (Reusch) by Signe Scheel, 1890
- Born: 16 January 1865; Fredrikstad, Norway
- Died: 13 October 1944 (aged 79); Hvalstad, Norway
- Known for: Painting
- Spouse: Hans Henrik Reusch

Helga Marie Ring Reusch (1865 – 1944) was a Norwegian painter.

== Biography ==
Helga Marie Ring Reusch was born 29 May 1865 in Fredrikstad. In the late 1800s she traveled to France, Spain, Italy and the United States. She studied with Erik Werenskiold, Hans Heyerdahl, Eilif Peterssen, Gerhard Munthe, and Pierre Puvis de Chavannes. She was married to the Norwegian geologist Hans Henrik Reusch (1852–1922).

Reusch exhibited frequently at the Høstutstillingen. She exhibited her work at the Palace of Fine Arts at the 1893 World's Columbian Exposition in Chicago, Illinois. She won a Bronze Medal at the 1900 Exposition Universelle in Paris.

Falsen died 13 October 1944 in Hvalstad.

== Gallery ==
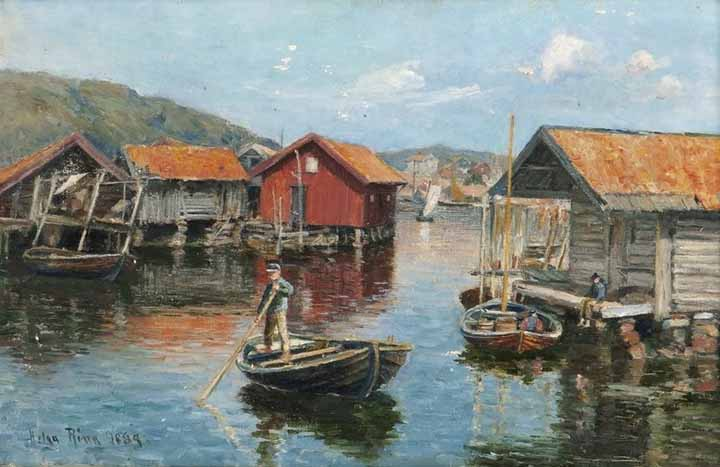
From a Swedish Fishing Camp, 1889

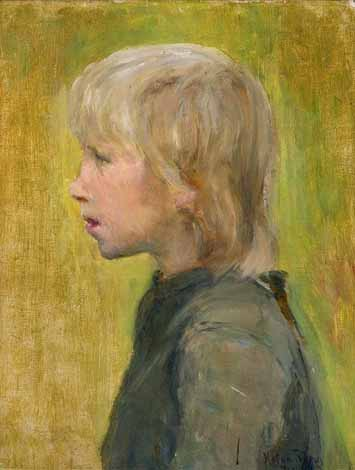
Child's head in profile, 1889
