= Free Journal Network =

Index of open access scholarly journals

The Free Journal Network is an index of open access scholarly journals, specifically for those that do not charge article processing charges.

== Criteria ==
The network founded in early 2018 in order to promote free, open access journals, a publishing model that is sometimes called diamond or platinum open access. Such journals are typically smaller than equivalent commercial journals (often supported by academic societies). Main criteria include: adherence to the Fair Open Access Principles that are publicly supported by many renowned scientists, publication of article titles and abstracts in English, clear publication ethics and quality assurance policies.

== FJN Member Journals ==
As of November 2024, there are 90 journals that have been accepted into the Free Journal Network. Some notable examples include:

- Discrete Analysis
- European Journal of Taxonomy
- Glossa
- Journal of Open Source Software
- Journal of Political Ecology
- Norwegian Journal of Geology
- SciPost Physics
- Volcanica

== See also ==
- Directory of Open Access Journals
- Open Access Scholarly Publishers Association
