= Nils H. Henningsmoen =

Norwegian military officer (1894–1983)

Nils Hansteen Henningsmoen (25 October 1894 – 25 January 1983) was a Norwegian military officer.

He was born in Eidsberg as a son of forest owner Martin Henningsmoen (1860-1943) and Kirstine Braarud (1868-1949). He was married twice. In 1919 he had the son Gunnar Henningsmoen, a palaeontologist.

He became a student in 1913 and was done with his officer training in 1916. He reached the ranks of captain in 1930, lieutenant colonel in 1936 and colonel in 1948. He spent his military career in the artillery. He was a battalion leader from 1936 to 1940, and during the Second World War he eventually escaped to Scotland and led a battery there from 1944 to 1945. He led AR 3 from 1948 to 1949, and Field Artillery Regiment 1 from 1949. From 1957 to 1958 he was the commander of Fredriksten Fortress. He was also a chief aide-de-camp for King Haakon VII of Norway from 1950 to 1953.

He was decorated as a Commander, First Class of the Order of the Sword and Knight of the Italian Order of the Crown. He died in January 1983 and was buried in Øymark.
