= Ruesch =

Ruesch is a surname. Notable people with the surname include:

- Hans Ruesch (1913–2007), Swiss racing driver, novelist, and animal activist
- Jason Rüesch (born 1994), Swiss cross-country skier
- Jurgen Ruesch (1909–1995), American psychiatrist

== See also ==
- Reusch, surname
