= Gunnar Henningsmoen =

Norwegian palaeontologist (1919–1996)

Gunnar Henningsmoen (17 September 1919 – 23 April 1996) was a Norwegian palaeontologist.

He was born in Kristiania, as a son of the Colonel Nils H. Henningsmoen. In 1962 he married Kari Egede Larssen.

He became a student in 1939 and graduated with the cand. real. degree from the University of Oslo in 1946. During the Second World War he had spent some time in exile in Sweden, after the University of Oslo was closed. He was hired as a curator at the Palaeontological Museum in 1948 and promoted to head curator in 1956. He took the dr.philos. degree in 1957 with the thesis The trilobite family Olenidae. He was the secretary-general of the International Commission on Stratigraphy from 1960 to 1965, a visiting professor at the University of Kansas from 1966 to 1967 and a professor at the University of Oslo from 1967. In addition to his academic publications, he is known for the popular release Trilobitter in 1977.

He was a member of the Norwegian Academy of Science and Letters from 1965. He was a board member of the Norwegian Geological Survey from 1947 to 1952, and edited the journal Norsk Geologisk Tidsskrift in 1966, 1968, 1969 and 1970. He died in April 1996.
