= Fennia (journal) =

- Discipline: Geography
- Language: English
- Edited by: Kirsi Pauliina Kallio

Publication details
- History: 1889-present
- Publisher: Geographical Society of Finland (Finland)
- Frequency: Biannual
- Open access: Yes
- License: Creative Commons Attribution License

Standard abbreviations
- ISO 4: Fennia

Indexing
- CODEN: FENNAJ
- ISSN: 0015-0010 (print); 1798-5617 (web)
- LCCN: 25018203
- OCLC no.: 60617276

Links
- Journal homepage; Online access

Fennia is a biannual peer-reviewed open access scientific journal published by the Geographical Society of Finland. It covers all aspects of geography. The journal was established in 1889. The editor-in-chief is Kirsi Pauliina Kallio (University of Tampere). The journal is abstracted and indexed in Scopus (Citescore 2024, 3.1) and the Web of Science Index (Impact Factor 2024, 1.6). It is a member of the Free Journal Network.

== See also ==
- Danish Journal of Geography
- Geografiska Annaler
- Norwegian Journal of Geography
