= Joseph Green (merchant) =

English merchant

Joseph Green (1727 – 27 June 1786) was an English merchant who became the "best friend" of Immanuel Kant.

== Biography ==
Green was born in Kingston upon Hull. He settled in Königsberg, Germany, and traded grains, coal, herring, and manufactured goods. Around 1752 Green hired Robert Motherby who also came from Hull as his assistant. Motherby later became his business partner and successor. Green never married.

It is not known when exactly Green became Kant's friend, but it was in 1763 or before according to a champagne glass inscribed with their names and some other friends' names. Green shared with Kant a deep appreciation of the ideas of David Hume and Jean-Jacques Rousseau, in addition, Green could provide a perspective on the outside world that was helpful for Kant. Meeting on a regular basis, Kant discussed his work with him, including every sentence of his "Critique of Pure Reason" prior to the 1781 publication. Kant also entrusted Green with his money.

Kant, who did not travel far beyond Königsberg, sent Green to visit Emanuel Swedenborg and check his health as Kant had doubts about his mental state. Green's sense of order and resulting pedantic punctuality inspired Theodor Gottlieb von Hippel to write a comedy: Der Mann nach der Uhr. This sense of order, regularity, and punctuality also had an effect on Kant. Kuehn remarks that "Green's effect upon Kant cannot be overestimated."

Green's death in 1786 deeply affected Kant.
