= Andersen Escarpment =

Coordinates: 85°8′S 91°37′W

The Andersen Escarpment is a steep rock and snow escarpment located south of Reed Ridge on the west side of the Ford Massif in the Thiel Mountains of Antarctica. The name was proposed by cartographer Peter F. Bermel and geologist Dr. Arthur B. Ford, co-leaders of the United States Geological Survey (USGS) Thiel Mountains party, 1960–61, for Bjørn G. Andersen, Norwegian professor of geology and glaciology at the University of Oslo, who was a member of the 1960–61 and 1961–62 USGS field parties to the Thiel Mountains.

Andersen made extensive studies of ice movements and climatic changes in the Antarctic, and was all his life a central Quaternary geologist with studies in Norway, North and South America (Chile), Antarctica (1979, 1980 and 1985), and New Zealand.
