= George Motherby =

George Motherby M.D. (baptised 1731 – 1793) was an English physician and medical writer. He is noted for the early definition of the medical term placebo in the 1785 edition of his medical dictionary.

== Life ==
He was born in Yorkshire, the son of George Motherby and his wife Anne Hotham; Robert Motherby was a younger brother, and his elder sister Anne married the London bookseller George Robinson (1736–1801). He gained an MD degree at King's College, Aberdeen in 1767.

Motherby then practised as a physician at Königsberg, in the Kingdom of Prussia. Through Robert, he came to be on good terms there with Johann Georg Hamann; and vaccinated one of his sons.

Motherby was later at Highgate, Middlesex. He died at Beverley, Yorkshire, in July 1793.

== Works ==
Motherby compiled A new Medical Dictionary, London, 1775 (2nd edit. 1785). Other editions, revised by George Wallis, M.D., appeared in 1791, 1795, and 1801; the two final editions were in two volumes. The articles included citations. A study of the first edition concluded that the most cited authorities were William Lewis (when his translation from Caspar Neumann is included), John Ray, and Herman Boerhaave; followed by Hippocrates and Galen.

== Notes ==
Attribution

This article incorporates text from a publication now in the public domain: Lee, Sidney, ed. (1894). "Motherby, George". Dictionary of National Biography. Vol. 39. London: Smith, Elder & Co. {{subst:}}
