= Christian Friedrich Reusch =

German administrative lawyer and writer

- Born: 25 November 1778; Königsberg, East Prussia, Prussia
- Died: 25 April 1848 (aged 69); Königsberg, East Prussia, Prussia, (Germany)
- Education: Königsberg
- Occupations: Lawyer; Secior government administrator
- Known for: membership of the Kant circle and his published memoires of Kant and friends
- Spouse: Marianne Friederike Heinriette Schultz
- Children: 7, including Rudolf Reusch (1810–1871)
- Parents: Karl Daniel Reusch (1735-1806) (father); Christina Charlotte Hagen (1745-1804) (mother)

Christian Friedrich Reusch (25 November 1778 – 25 April 1848) was a German administrative lawyer and writer who became an increasingly senior government administrator in East Prussia. He was, like his father, a member of the social circle of intellectuals, the Philosophes, surrounding the celebrity enlightenment philosopher Immanuel Kant. Reusch is remembered two centuries later for his surviving written recollections of Kant and his friends before and during the years dominated by the French Revolution of 1789 and the ensuing wars which it triggered across Europe.

== Life ==
=== Provenance and early years ===
Christian Friedrich Reusch, named after his paternal grandfather, was the middle son of the three born to the Königsberg physicist and librarian Karl Daniel Reusch (1735-1806) and his wife. He received his early schooling, together with his elder brother, from a home tutor. Later he moved on to the Cathedral School. As a scholar he excelled, becoming a favourite with the rector (head) and his teaching staff. Between 1793 and 1797 he studied aspects of Jurisprudence at the University of Königsberg where, like his father, his teachers included Immanuel Kant, whose lectures he is reported to have attended on subjects such as Logic, Metaphysics and Physiography. In December 1797 he passed the exam necessary to clear the first rung of his Auskultator (post-graduate legal traineeship), and was sworn into membership of the legal profession in January 1798 and continuing through his referendary (traineeship) years.

=== Government service ===
Reusch went on to enter government service, following a family tradition that went back at least four generations. Having visited Berlin in order to compete in and pass the appropriate exam on 31 January 1803, he received a Justiz – Commissarius certificate which entitled him to work in a junior judicial post as an Assessor. There was a shortage of suitable vacancies, however, and the only one in prospect would have involved working for the recently established regional government of the recently created South Prussia, in the part of the province surrounding Warsaw. The political outlook remained far from certain in the aftermath of the Treaty of Lunéville, however, and Reusch was evidently in no hurry to launch his judicial career far from home in a province which might easily be annexed at short notice into one of the three competing empires surrounding Prussia. Reusch instead spent the first half of 1803 undertaking a “grand tour”, visiting in rapid succession Magdeburg, Halberstadt and Quedlinburg before crossing over the Harz mountains to Göttingen and as far west as Kassel, before completing the circle via Eisenach, Gotha, Weimar, Halle an der Saale, Leipzig, Dresden and Berlin back home to Königsberg where he arrived on 17 June 1803.

Through the good offices of Ernst Gottlob Morgenbesser, a top lawyer officer (who less than a year later would be appointed head of government), Reusch was employed as an Assessor by the regional government in Königsberg, soon afterwards moving on to undertake the same work at the regional courts. His initial remuneration was half that of a full judge, but the differential narrowed over the next couple of years. However, following the ceding of the Polish provinces (rebranded Duchy of Warsaw) to the French at the end of 1807 a number of Prussian judges more senior and experienced than he was, were relocated to East Prussia. Reusch was obliged to look for alternative employment. On 18 April 1808 he was offered and accepted an administrative government post with the Kriegs- und Domainen-Kammer as a "Second-level assistant". His starting salary of 730 Thalers implies a position of some importance in the structure which, as Prussia struggled to reinvent itself following the catastrophic events of 1807, was emerging as the kingdom's government.

=== Government restructuring ===
Although Prussia had only been stripped of approximately half of its territory, the lost western territories had been the prosperous ones, and the government faced a loss in tax revenue greatly in excess of 50%. There was an urgent need to strengthen the state internally to compensate for the external losses, and the consequence of this perception was a fundamental restructuring of state administration in the broadest sense. The challenge of creating a series of new effective and efficient organisational structures was one for which Reusch was reportedly well suited. The Kammer-Direktor Ludwig von Wißmann, whose responsibilities Reusch would in most respects assume after Wißmann was promoted to the role of Regierungspräsident (regional governor), took care to engage his successor in setting up the new institutions for which he would be responsible. He was involved in creating local policing and financial authorities and in detailed reconfiguration of fire insurance arrangements and of the Commerz–Collegium (loosely, 'chamber of commerce'). He had already contributed the recommendation that administration of commercial insolvencies should be taken under the control of the Collegium. During this period Reusch also drafted the Allgemeine Städte-Ordnung (loosely, 'Municipal [legal] code').

=== Post-war promotion ===
On 3 December 1810 Reusch took on another appointment which he undertook in parallel with his government duties, as legal advisor to Königsberg's Kontor, the "Salt and Maritime Trade Bureau", which increased his workload but also increased his income by approximately 200 Thalers annually. In 1815, as the practical difficulties and traumas created by nearly a quarter century of war began slowly to recede, he was selected as chief advisor to the East Prussia Oberpräsident, following the transfer of his predecessor in the post to Berlin. At the Congress of Vienna it had been determined that the Kingdom of Prussia would become much larger than it had ever been, and its outline on the map of Europe would be very different from that of any earlier version of Prussia. In the east, some of the territories that had been taken from Poland during the eighteenth century remained lost to the Russian Empire, but in terms of land area and economic potential this loss was more than matched by the land acquisitions from formerly semi-independent states to the west. For the British and Austrian leaders setting the agenda for the post-war settlement in 1815, the objective was not merely to reward Prussia for its military contribution to the eventual defeat of Napoleon, but also to create a militarily strong state on France’s eastern side which would discourage and, it was hoped, prevent any future re-run of the Napoleonic Wars. In his new role as chief advisor to the East Prussia Oberpräsident, in 1816 Reusch attended, with his boss, the conference at Marienwerder in order to join with their counterparts in West Prussia and negotiate the future structures and interactions of the state institutions for the post-war era. A little later he participated at a conference in Berlin involving Finance Minister Hans Graf von Bülow, convened to work on the creation of a new tax system for a new Prussia.

As early as 1816 there was discussion of the Prussian government posting Reusch to Cologne in order to work on setting up an administrative structure in what would soon become known as the Prussian Rhine Province. The idea was blocked by Chancellor von Hardenberg on the grounds that the regional government in Königsberg had already lost 15 experienced members and should not afford the loss of any more. In his later years Reusch would often express regret. Much as he loved his home city, a posting to Cologne in the far west of the country would have opened up a wide range of new opportunities for him. Nevertheless, his contributions did not go unappreciated in Königsberg. On 16 January 1920 he was appointed a privy counsellor. Two months later the king sent an appreciative letter to the East Prussian Oberpräsident Auerswald in which he thanked the regional government in Königsberg for the eagerness of its officials to serve in the creation of a Landwehr (standing militia), in which he cited Reusch by name. In April 1824 the king awarded Reusch the Order of the Red Eagle Knight's Cross.

=== University curator ===
In 1824 Regierungspräsident (state president) Theodor von Baumann was transferred from Königsberg to an equivalent appointment in Posen. In Königsberg he held the post in parallel with a government power of Regierungs-Bevollmächtigten over the university, an oversight position with, potentially, huge influence and power over tertiary education in the province. His departure created a vacancy in Königsberg. Baumann himself recommended that Reusch should fill the vacancy in respect of responsibilities over the university. Reusch accepted the resulting offer only conditionally, however. There was still a continuing debate concerning an increasingly prescriptive approach to the university, reform driven, primarily, from Berlin. The entire business had become contentious, conflated with nationalist passions and church–state rivalries. Reusch wanted nothing to do with the wranglings on university reform and nominated a colleague to take on this part of the portfolio. The proposal was accepted on 30 November 1824, and therefore when Christian Friedrich Reusch took on the role, it was with a salary of 700 Thalers as part of a two-man University Curatorium, while Regierungsrath Heyne took responsibility for the contentious issues affecting reforms for the university, and a salary of 300 Thalers. Over the next few years, a more wide-ranging reallocation of responsibilities took place over the education sector and more broadly in the provincial governance of East Prussia, governed from Königsberg.

=== Further government restructuring ===
The principal areas of responsibility were subdivided into two departments, while both were relieved of the need to look after indirect taxes, responsibility for which was hived off into a separate provincial taxation directorate. One of the two departments was to look after church and schools administration and the other attended to direct taxation, government lands and forests, and other "interior ministry" matters administered at the provincial level. Each of these two departments was presided over by its own director, who enjoyed the rank, remuneration and status of a senior government administrator. This new governance structure was implemented at Königsberg with effect from 1 January 1826. Despite the separation into two administrative departments, directorial control of both of them was entrusted to a single man, Privy Counsellor Reusch, who was promoted at the same time to the rank of Oberregierungsrat. The arrangement lasted till 1831, when the sheer volume of work associated with the nineteenth century tendency for government to intrude in ever greater detail on the way in which society was ordered, made a more complete separation of the two administrative departments of the provincial government desirable. At that point, the scope of Reusch's responsibilities came to be restricted to the department responsible for administration of church and schools. Meanwhile, at the university his fellow member of the Curatorium, Regierungsrath Heyne, obtained a promotion which involved relocating to Danzig in West Prussia. Responsibilities in respect of university reforms now reverted to Reusch who became sole "curator", charged with managing the government's duties in respect of the university. An additional allowance of 300 Thalers was added to his remuneration package.

=== Recognition ===
A further mark of royal recognition came on 18 January 1835 when Reusch became a Knight, third class of the Order of the Red Eagle. Two years later, on 5 November 1837, he received an honorary doctorate in recognition of his services over many years to the University of Königsberg. Further honours followed.

=== Death ===
Christian Friedrich Reusch died during his seventieth year at Königsberg on 25 April 1848. His death came overnight on the Tuesday following Easter, which that year fell very late. His end was relatively quick. During the evening of the Easter Monday holiday, he participated in a seasonal celebration at his home with his family and a few close friends. When he went to bed that night he appeared well. During the night, however, his wife heard him giving out an unfamiliar rattling noise. Doctors were immediately called, but they could do nothing to revive him, and he died less than an hour later, probably as the result of a stroke.

== Personal ==
On 12 October 1809 Christian Friedrich Reusch married Marianne Friederike Heinriette Schultz, the daughter of a senior official from Labiau (as Polessk was known before 1945). The marriage was followed by the births of the couple's seven recorded children. Three of these predeceased their father, however, leaving only two sons and two daughters surviving to adulthood. The eldest of these, Rudolf Reusch (1810–1871), later achieved a measure of notability on his own account as a lawyer, writer and folklore and dialect revivalist.

== Immanuel Kant ==
Immanuel Kant became well known in intellectual circles for the dinners which he regularly hosted at his home, at which pressing philosophical and other compelling topics of those times were discussed. The dinners were so greatly valued by participants that after Kant died in 1804 his friends set up an association focused on perpetuating the contributions of their illustrious mentor in part through continuing to hold the Kant dinners without Kant. Although Reusch was still quite a young man when Kant died, he had gained early admission to the Kant circle through his father's long membership of the Kant circle. Reusch's own memoires of Kant, despite being relatively short, remain a valued source on Kant's life for specialist scholars.
