= Arne Bjørlykke =

Norwegian geologist

Arne Bjørlykke (born 3 October 1943) is a Norwegian geologist.

He took an education in mining engineering at the Norwegian Institute of Technology, graduating in 1967. He worked at the Norwegian Geological Survey from 1968 to 1984, and was then a professor at the University of Oslo from 1984 to 1994. He then returned to the Norwegian Geological Survey as managing director from 1994 to 2006 and senior researcher from 2006 to 2009. In 2009 he was hired as the new director of the Natural History Museum at the University of Oslo, succeeding Elen Roaldset. He is a fellow of the Norwegian Academy of Technological Sciences.
