= Hans Henrik Reusch =

Norwegian geologist, geomorphologist and educator (1852–1922)

Hans Reusch
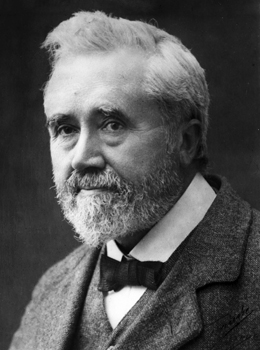
- Born: 5 September 1852
- Died: 27 October 1922 (aged 70)
- Citizenship: Norway
- Education: Det Kongelige Frederiks Universitet
- Known for: Geography schoolbooks Silurian in Norway; Paleic surface Strandflat; Reusch's Moraine
- Spouse: Helga Marie Ring Reusch
- Awards: Lyell Medal
- Scientific career
- Fields: Geology, Geography
- Workplaces: Geological Survey of Norway

Hans Henrik Reusch (5 September 1852 – 27 October 1922) was a Norwegian geologist, geomorphologist and educator. He served as director of the Geological Survey of Norway.

== Biography ==
Born in Bergen, he was educated at the University of Leipzig and Heidelberg University. He graduated Ph.D. at the University of Christiania (now University of Oslo) in 1883. He was married to the painter Helga Marie Ring Reusch He joined the Geological Survey of Norway in 1875, and was its Director from 1888 to 1921. He was a Sturgis Hooper Professor of Geology at Harvard University (1897–98).

He is distinguished for his research on the crystalline schists and the Palaeozoic rocks of Norway. He discovered Silurian fossils in the highly altered rocks of the Bergen region; and in 1891 he called attention to the so-called "Reusch's Moraine" a Precambrian conglomerate of glacial origin in the Varanger Fjord, a view confirmed by A. Strahan in 1896, who found glacial striations on the rocks beneath the ancient boulder-bed. Reusch has likewise thrown light on the later geological periods, on the Pleistocene glacial phenomena and on the sculpturing of the scenery of Norway.

In 1877 Reusch founded a popular science magazine, Naturen. He edited it for the first four years. Among his separate publications were Silurfossiler og pressede Konglomerater (1882) and Det nordlige Norges Geologi (1891). He chaired the Norwegian Geographical Society from 1898 to 1903, and from 1907 to 1909. In 1900 he was among the founders of the Norwegian association of book artwork (Foreningen for norsk bokkunst). In 1907, his honorary doctorate was awarded at Oxford University. In 1922, he served as the first chairman of the Norwegian Association of Bibliophiles (Bibliofiklubben).

Reusch died at Hvalstad Station while attempting to enter a train. At the time of his death, his large private library of books encompassed 12 000 volumes. He is commemorated by the Reusch Medal, awarded by the Norwegian Geological Society. Reusch Glacier in Antarctica, Reuschhalvøya and Reuschfjellet on Svalbard were also named in his honor.
