= Olaf Holtedahl =

Norwegian geologist

Professor Olaf Holtedahl ForMemRS FRSE
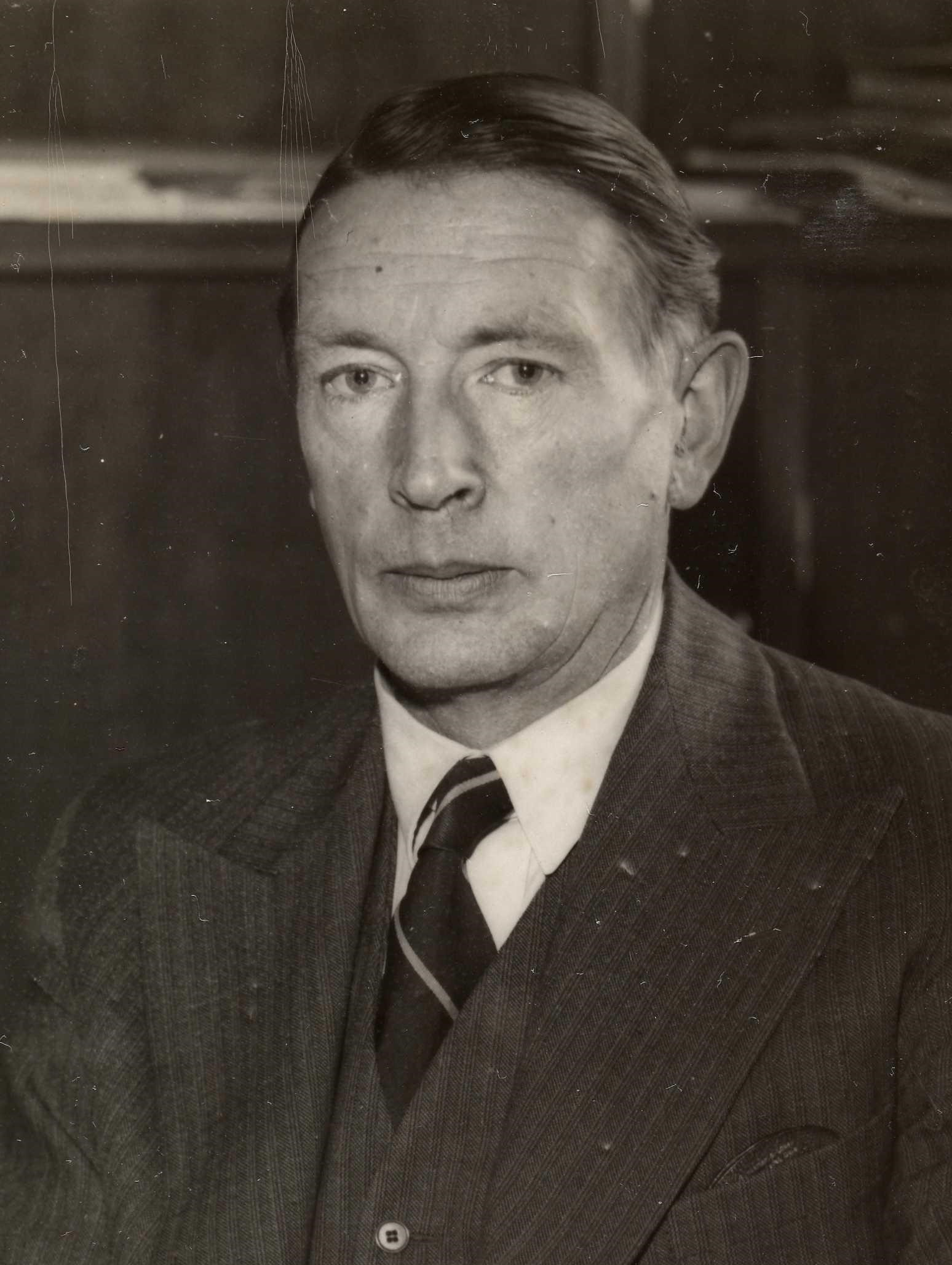
- Olaf Holtedahl
- Born: 24 June 1885
- Died: 26 August 1975 (aged 90)
- Awards: Fellow of the Royal Society
- Scientific career
- Institutions: University of Oslo

Olaf Holtedahl (24 June 1885 – 26 August 1975) was a Norwegian geologist (Dr.philos., 1913). He became a senior lecturer at the University of Oslo in 1914, and was Professor of Geology there from 1920 to 1956.

== Career ==
Olaf Holtedahl was born in Kristiania (modern-day Oslo), Norway, the son of Arne H. Holtedahl, superintendent of pauper administration, and his wife, Mathilde Madsen.

Around 1903 he did his obligatory military service at Gardermoen, just north of Oslo, and here met Captain Gunnar Isachsen who greatly influenced him, and first inspired his interest in polar regions. In 1909, Isachsen invited Holtedahl to join him in explorations of Spitsbergen as official geologist of the group.

He studied geology at the University of Oslo, graduating in 1909 and receiving a doctorate in 1913. Staying in the university as staff he received his professorship in 1920.

Holtedahl was among the last of a generation of geologists that mastered the subject in all its breadth. He delivered a significant contribution, not only in Norway but also for large areas of the Arctic and Antarctic. His first geological work dealt with the Oslo Rift in the Cambrosilurian period, and he was part of the 1909–11 expeditions to Svalbard. Between 1914 and 1917, he explored the geology of Lapland, and in 1918, he worked at Bear Island. In 1921 he led a Norwegian expedition to Novaya Zemlya. He joined the 1927–28 Antarctic expeditions of Lars Christensen, and he edited the scientific results from these expeditions . He was the doctoral advisor of Bjørn G. Andersen, whose subsequent works on Quaternary geology he greatly influenced.

In the Second World War he was a member of the Norwegian resistance movement.

Holtedahl died in Oslo on 26 August 1975.

== Family ==
He married Tora Gurstad in 1912. Their children include Professor of geology Hans Holtedahl (1917–2001).

== Honors and awards ==
- Wollaston Medal (1951)
- Elected member of the Royal Society in 1961
