= Geological Survey of Norway =

Norwegian government agence

- Norges geologiske undersøkelse
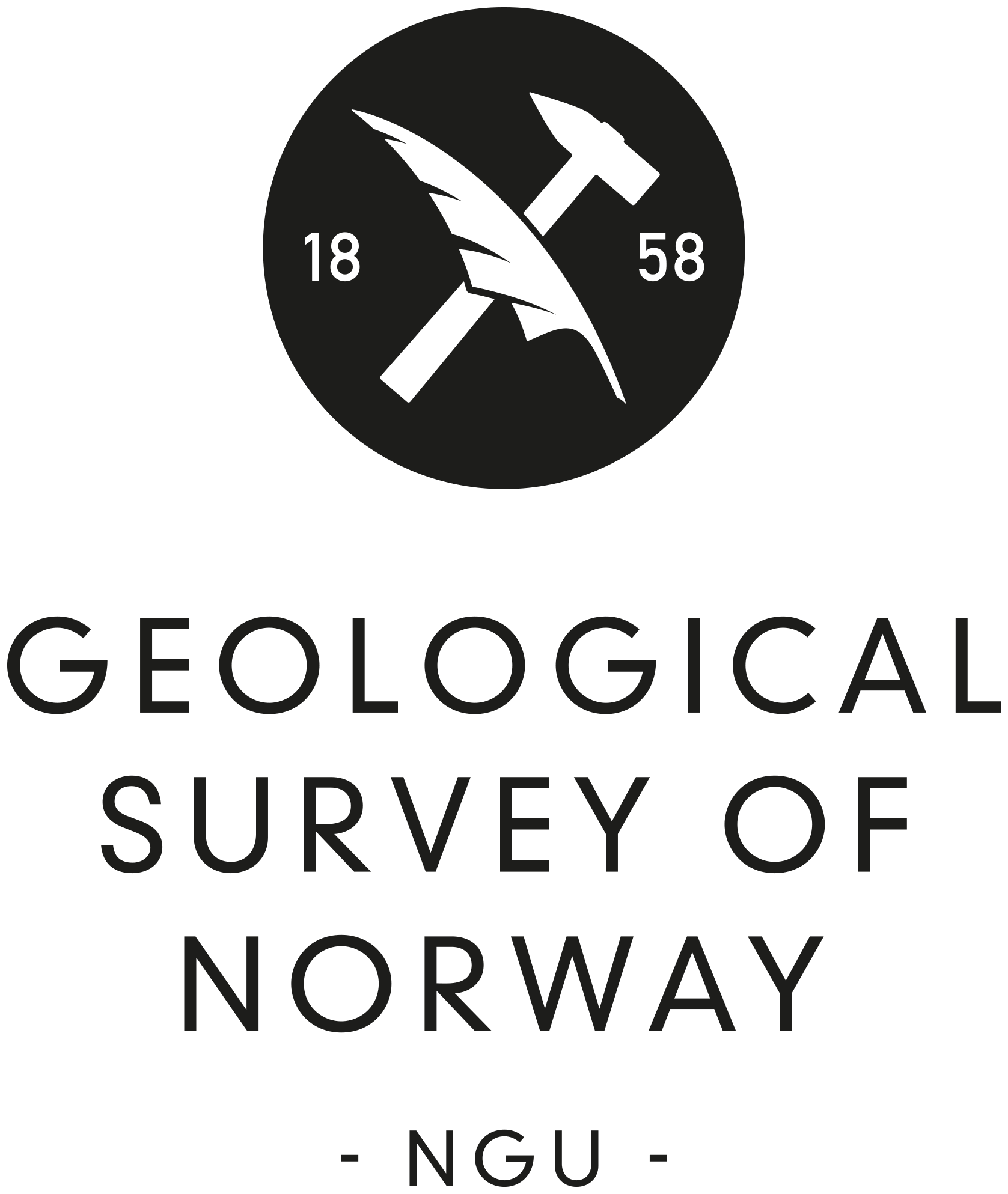
- Geological Survey of Norway logo

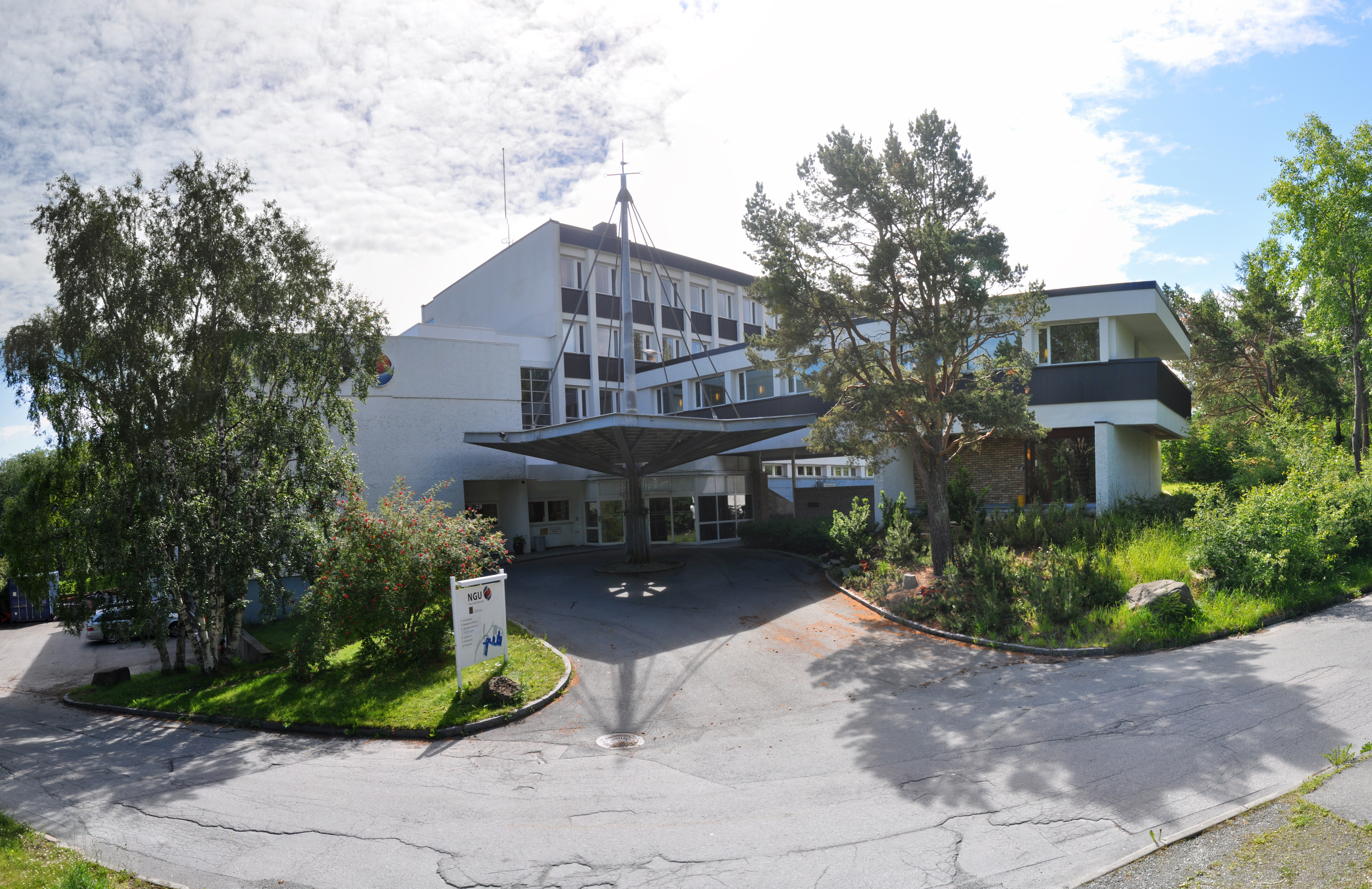
- The entrance to NGU's headquarters in Trondheim, Norway

Government agency overview
- Type: Geological survey
- Headquarters: Trondheim, Norway; 63°27′18″N 10°26′42″E
- Motto: Geology for the society
- Employees: 202 (2016)
- Annual budget: 260 million NOK
- Minister responsible: May Britt Myhr, Director-general
- Parent department: Norwegian Ministry of Trade, Industry and Fisheries
- Child agencies: NGU Geodatacentre Løkken; NGU Tromsø
- Website: www.ngu.no

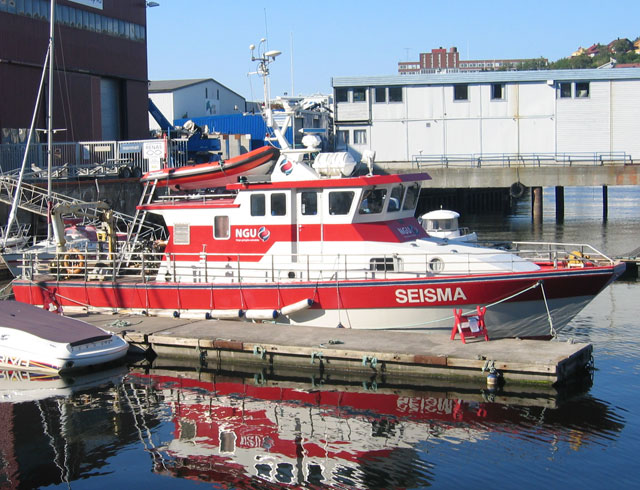
The NGU research vessel Seisma

Geological Survey of Norway (Norwegian: Norges geologiske undersøkelse), abbreviation: NGU, is a Norwegian government agency responsible for geologic mapping and research. The agency is located in Trondheim with an office in Tromsø, with about 200 employees. It is subordinate to the Norwegian Ministry of Trade, Industry and Fisheries.

== Mission ==
Coat of arms

NGU's main work is related to collecting, processing and imparting knowledge related to the physical, chemical and mineralogical characteristics of the country's bedrock, mineral resources, deposits and groundwater. Important areas include the Arctic, Antarctica, Svalbard and the continental shelf. With the motto "Geology for the Society", NGU provides maps and geological information in national databases. The activity is organized after five key principles:

1. Long-term value creation from geological resources
2. Increase the use of geoscience knowledge in spatial planning and development
3. Enhanced knowledge of the country's construction and geological processes
4. Good communication, management and customization of geological knowledge
5. Increased quality and efficiency through good interaction internally and externally

== History ==
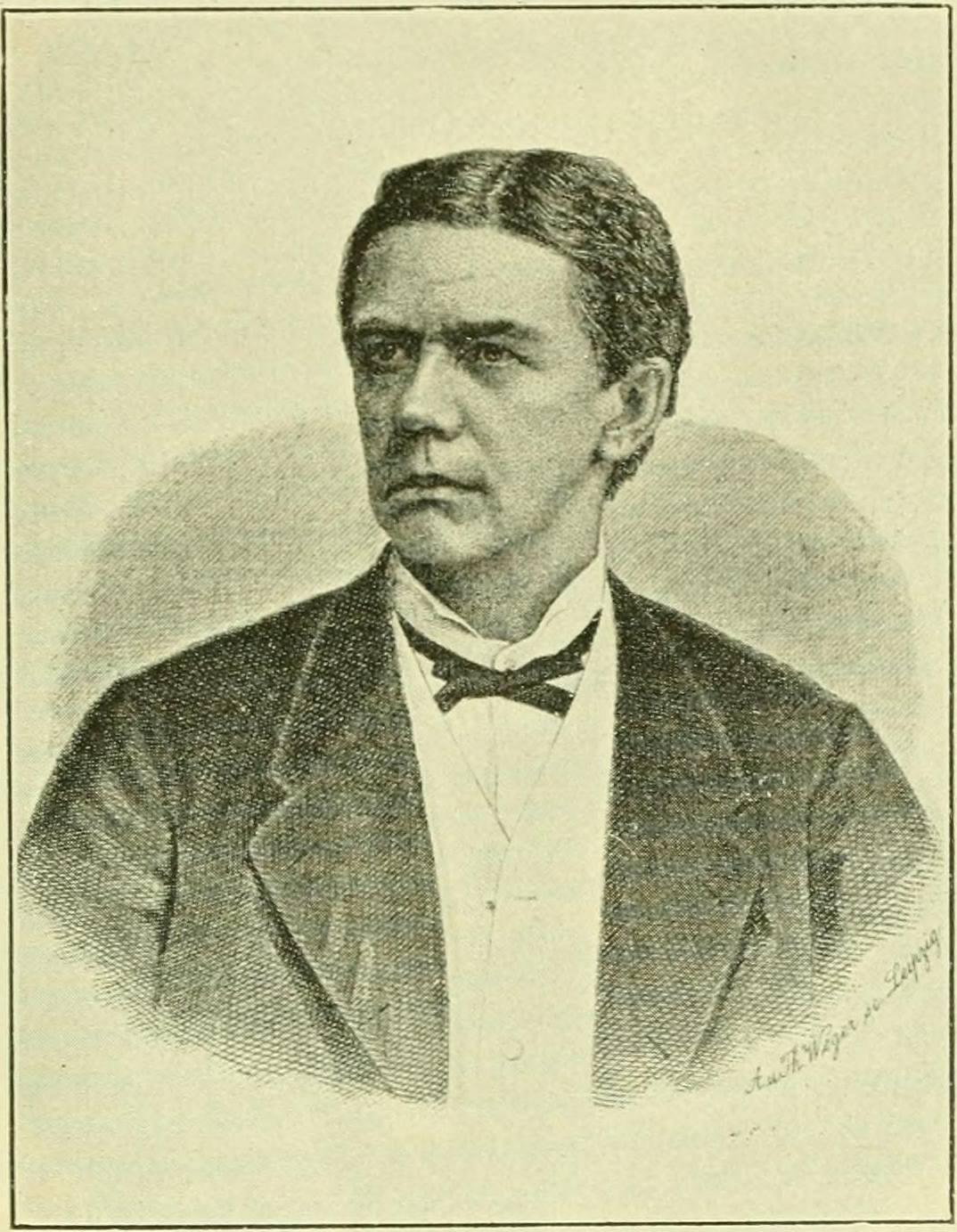
Theodor Kjerulf

The Geological Survey of Norway was established on 6 February 1858 by Order in Council. A few years earlier, the geology student Theodor Kjerulf had submitted the idea of a Norwegian geological survey to the Norwegian interior ministry. The survey would serve to map the country's agricultural areas and mineral deposits, as well as systematically study how the Norwegian landscape had been formed. In the mid-19th century Norway was modernizing quickly by developing industry and knowledge, along with evolving cultural life. An institution such as a Norwegian geological survey would be "convenient, scientifically necessary and honorable for the nation". The first years of its existence, mapping the bedrock, superficial deposits and mineral resources was its principal task, but it contributed to a Norwegian sense of ownership to the land, something that was especially important around 1905, after the Union with Sweden was dissolved. The manager Theodor Kjerulf, and his assistant, Tellef Dahll, shared the mapping of Norway. They purchased equipment, planned the work and trained their field assistants to carry out the surveys.

Manager Kjerulf along with Dahll and several assistants had, after about twenty years of work, completed three sets of maps. Det sødenfjeldske in 1:400 000, Trondheim stift in 1:800 000 and Det nordlige Norge in 1:1 million. The maps and their descriptions gave new and valuable knowledge about the Norwegian landscape, and showed that it was possible to combine the scientific, economic and cultural ambitions Kjerulf had fronted when he set out to create the survey.

== Organization ==
There are five support divisions within the agency:

- Geological Mapping
  - Solid Earth Geology
  - Quaternary Geology
  - Marine Geology
  - Geochemistry and Hydrogeology
  - Geohazard and Earth Observation
- Geological Resources and Environment
  - Geophysics
  - Natural Construction Materials
  - Mineral resources
  - NGU Laboratory
- Information and Communication Technology
  - Geomatics and IT
- HR & Resource Management
  - HR
  - Accounting and Administration
- Communications and Public Relations
  - Communication

=== Directors ===
Manager	Timespan
Theodor Kjerulf	6. February 1858 – 1888
Hans Henrik Reusch	1888–1921
The title manager was replaced by Director-general in 1915.
Carl Bugge	1921–1951
Sven Føyn	1951–1958
Harald Bjørlykke	1958–1963
Karl Ingvaldsen	1963–1973
Knut Heier	1974–1994
Arne Bjørlykke	1994 – 1 August. 2006
Morten Smelror	1 August 2006 – 2018
May Britt Myhr	2018–

== See also ==
- Geology of Norway
