= Norwegian Journal of Geography =

- Discipline: Geography
- Language: English, Norwegian

Publication details
- Former name: Norsk Geografisk Aarbog
- History: 1926–present
- Publisher: Routledge on behalf of the Norwegian Geographical Society (Norway)
- Frequency: 5/year
- Impact factor: 0.698 (2013)

Standard abbreviations
- ISO 4: Nor. J. Geogr.

Indexing
- CODEN: NGGTA2
- ISSN: 0029-1951 (print); 1502-5292 (web)
- LCCN: 30007262
- OCLC no.: 709965404

Links
- Journal homepage; Online access; Online archive

Norwegian Journal of Geography (Norwegian: Norsk Geografisk Tidsskrift) is a peer-reviewed scientific journal published by Routledge on behalf of the Norwegian Geographical Society. It covers geographical topics of interest to Norwegian researchers giving equal weight to human and natural geography. It was established in 1926 as successor of the Norsk Geografisk Aarbog ("Norwegian Geographical Yearbook"), which was published from 1889 to 1921.

The editor-in-chief at one point was Kerstin Potthoff of University of Bergen.

In 2012, Michael Jones was the editor, and he had started in 2006. He was based at the Norwegian University of Science and Technology, in Trondheim. He announced that as of 2012 the journal would change from publishing four issues per year to five, and that the number of editors had increased to four. He stated:

As before, the journal publishes articles on themes related to the geography of Norway, the other Nordic countries and adjacent regions, including polar regions, and also on relevant topics concerning other parts of the world. The journal invites contributions from: (1) geographers and other academics writing on geographical themes based on research undertaken at Norwegian and other Nordic universities or research institutions, and (2) geographers and other academics writing on themes that are of interest to the Norwegian and wider Nordic geographical community. The journal publishes one to two special issues each year on particular themes.

In 2022, editors-in-chief were Arne Isaksen and Jon P. Knudsen, both of the University of Agder, in Grimstad Municipality, Norway.

== Abstracting and indexing ==
The journal is abstracted and indexed in Energy Research Abstracts, GEOBASE, Geographical Abstracts/Human Geography, Geographical Abstracts/Physical Geography, Geological Abstracts, Scopus, and the Social Sciences Citation Index According to the Journal Citation Reports, the journal has a 2013 impact factor of 0.698.

== See also ==
- Fennia
- Geografiska Annaler
- Norwegian Journal of Geology
