= Geological Society of Norway =

The Geological Society of Norway (GSN) (in Norwegian: Norsk Geologisk Forening) is a Norwegian learned society founded in 1905. Among the founders was geologist Hans Henrik Reusch, who also was the first chairman of the society.

The society publishes the journal Norwegian Journal of Geology. The Norwegian Geological Society has awarded the Reusch Medal to deserving geologists since 1926.
