= Reusch Medal =

The Reusch Medal (Norwegian: Reusch-medaljen) is a medal awarded by the Norwegian Geological Society to young researchers in recognition of a high-quality treatise on geology. It has been awarded since 4 January 1926 in honor of the geologist Hans Henrik Reusch (1852–1922).

== See also ==
- List of geology awards
