= Geografiska Annaler =

- Discipline: Series A: Physical geography, glaciology, quaternary science Series B: Human geography, economic geography
- Language: English

Publication details
- History: 1919–present
- Publisher: Swedish Society for Anthropology and Geography (Sweden)
- Frequency: Quarterly (Series A)
- Impact factor: 1.881 (2020)

Standard abbreviations
- ISO 4: Geogr. Ann.

Indexing
- ISSN: 1651-3215
- JSTOR: 16513215

Links
- Journal homepage

Geografiska Annaler is a scientific journal published by the Swedish Society for Anthropology and Geography in Stockholm, Sweden. The journal is founded in 1919. Since 1965 the journal is published in two series A and B. Series A deals with arctic research, physical geography, glaciology and quaternary science in general. Series B covers the topics of human geography and economic geography, with a special, but not exclusive, focus on the Nordic and Baltic countries.
