= Ohio Range =

Hills in the Horlick Mountains of Antarctica

- Location within Antarctica

Highest point
- Peak: Mount Schopf
- Elevation: 2,990 m (9,810 ft)

Geography
- Continent: Antarctica
- Area: Marie Byrd Land
- Range coordinates: 84°45′S 114°00′W
- Parent range: Horlick Mountains

The Ohio Range (84°45′S 114°00′W) is a range in the Transantarctic Mountains of Antarctica. It is about 30 nautical miles (56 km; 35 mi) long and 10 nautical miles (19 km; 12 mi) wide, extending west-southwest – east-northeast from Eldridge Peak to Mirsky Ledge. The range forms the northeast end of the Horlick Mountains and consists primarily of a large snow-topped plateau with steep northern cliffs and several flat-topped ridges and mountains. The highest point, 2,990 metres (9,810 ft), is the summit of Mount Schopf.

== Exploration and naming ==
The range was surveyed in 1958–59 by the United States Antarctic Research Program (USARP) Horlick Mountains Traverse. In October 1958 William E. Long (for whom the Long Hills are named) made a round trip by air from the Byrd Station in West Antarctica over the Wisconsin Range, Ohio Range, Thiel Mountains and Whitmore Mountains. Long noted that the Ohio Range has a thick layer of stratified rocks. Later a tractor train visited the base of Mount Glossopteris, where four of the party climbed the mountain and collected samples of rock and fossils. The range was investigated in 1960–61 and 1961–62 by geologists of the Institute of Polar Studies of Ohio State University, for which the range is named.

== Location ==
Features of the east of the Ohio Range, from west to east, include Eldridge Peak, Vann Peak, Knox Peak, Lackey Ridge, Bennett Nunataks, Darling Ridge and Tuning Nunatak. The Buckeye Table runs along the south of the central part. To its north are Ricker Canyon, Schulthess Bluff, Higgins Canyon, Treves Butte, Discovery Ridge and Mount Glossopteris. In the east Mount Schopf is surrounded by Terrace Ridge, Mercer Ridge and Skinner Peak. Mirsky Ledge is in the extreme east, with Urbanak Peak and Iverson Peak. A blue ice field on the west of the Treves Butte, 6 by 1 kilometre (3.73 by 0.62 mi), has been reviewed as a runway for wheeled aircraft. It is not considered promising.

== Western features ==
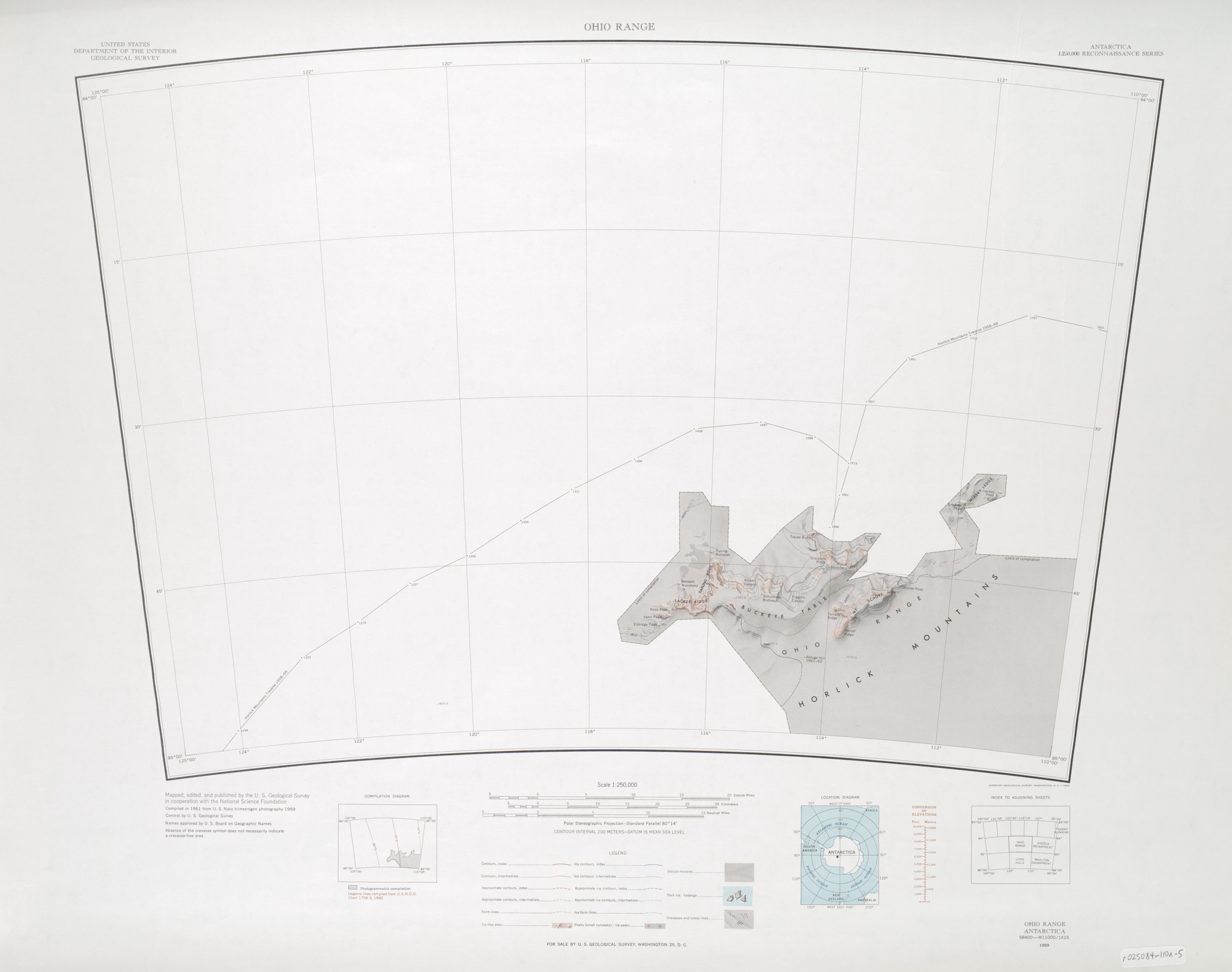
Ohio Range in southeast of map

=== Eldridge Peak ===
84°51′S 116°50′W. A small, mainly ice-free peak, or nunatak, marking the west extremity of the Ohio Range. Surveyed by the USARP Horlick Mountains Traverse party in Dec. 1958. Named by the United States Advisory Committee on Antarctic Names (US-ACAN) for Henry M. Eldridge, Antarctic cartographer, Branch of Special Maps, United States Geological Survey.

=== Vann Peak ===
84°50′S 116°43′W. A small but prominent bare rock peak, 2,140 metres (7,020 ft) high, which is the central and dominant feature of three aligned peaks at the west end of Ohio Range. Surveyed by the USARP Horlick Mountains Traverse party in December 1958. Named by US-ACAN for Charlie E. Vann, chief of the photogrammetry unit responsible for Antarctic maps in the Branch of Special Maps, United States Geological Survey.

=== Knox Peak ===
84°49′S 116°39′W. A small but distinctive rock peak, or nunatak, located between Vann Peak and Lackey Ridge at the west end of the Ohio Range. Surveyed by the USARP Horlick Mountains Traverse party in Dec. 1958. Named by US-ACAN for Arthur S. Knox, Antarctic cartographer, Branch of Special Maps, United States Geological Survey.

=== Lackey Ridge ===
84°49′S 116°15′W. An east-west ridge, 4 nautical miles (7.4 km; 4.6 mi) long, that forms the west end of Buckeye Table in the Ohio Range. Named by US-ACAN for Larry L. Lackey, geologist with the Ohio State University expedition to the Horlick Mountains in 1960-61.

=== Thumb Promontory ===
84°48′S 116°18′W. A prominent rock spur on the north side of Lackey Ridge, Ohio Range. Thumb Promontory was unofficially named by a NZARP field party to the Ohio Range, 1979-80. The name was formally proposed by geologist Margaret Bradshaw, member of a second NZARP field party, 1983–84. So named because of the similarity of the upper part of this feature to an upturned thumb from certain angles.

=== Bennett Nunataks ===
84°47′S 116°25′W. Two rock nunataks 0.5 nautical miles (0.93 km; 0.58 mi) apart, lying 0.5 nautical miles (0.93 km; 0.58 mi) north of Lackey Ridge. Surveyed by the USARP Horlick Mountains Traverse party in Dec. 1958. Named by US-ACAN for John B. Bennett, geomagnetist-seismologist at Byrd Station, 1960.

=== Darling Ridge ===
84°46′S 115°54′W. A snow-covered, flat-topped ridge, 2,350 metres (7,710 ft) high, with precipitous rock sides. The ridge is 2.5 nautical miles (4.6 km; 2.9 mi) long and forms a notable landmark at the northwest corner of Buckeye Table. Surveyed by the USARP Horlick Mountains Traverse party in Dec. 1958. Named by US-ACAN for Fredric L. Darling, glaciological assistant with the party.

=== Tuning Nunatak ===
84°44′S 115°58′W. A small rock nunatak 1 nautical mile (1.9 km; 1.2 mi) north of Darling Ridge. Surveyed by the USARP Horlick Mountains Traverse party in Dec. 1958. Named by US-ACAN for Preston O. Tuning, meteorologist at Byrd Station in 1960.

== Central features ==
=== Buckeye Table ===
84°49′S 114°45′W. A plateau, 12 nautical miles (22 km; 14 mi) long and 2 to 5 nautical miles (3.7 to 9.3 km; 2.3 to 5.8 mi) wide, occupying the central part of Ohio Range. The feature is a high level snow surface with precipitous northern cliffs; the plateau surface merges gradually with the inland ice to the south. The name, a nickname of the state of Ohio and Ohio State University, was proposed by William H. Chapman, USGS surveyor in these mountains in the 1958–59 season. Ohio State University and its Institute of Polar Studies initiated a program of geological investigation in the Ohio Range and the Horlick Mountains beginning in the 1960-61 season.

=== Ricker Canyon ===
84°47′S 115°18′W. A steep-sided, ice-filled canyon that indents the north escarpment of Buckeye Table between Darling Ridge and Schulthess Buttress, in the Ohio Range. Named by US-ACAN for John F. Ricker, geologist with the Ohio State University expedition to the Horlick Mountains in 1961–62.

=== Schulthess Buttress ===
84°47′S 115°00′W. A broad ice-capped bluff between Ricker and Higgins Canyons on the north side of Buckeye Table. The feature has steep ice and rock cliffs and is prominent when viewed from northward. Surveyed in December 1958 by the USARP Horlick Mountains Traverse party. Named by US-ACAN for Emil Schulthess, Swiss photographer who accompanied the party during part of the traverse. He subsequently published an excellent photographic portrait of the continent in his book Antarctica, 1960.

=== Higgins Canyon ===
84°47′S 114°41′W. A steep.sided, ice-filled canyon immediately east of Schulthess Buttress, on the north side of Buckeye Table in the Ohio Range. Named by US-ACAN for Merwyn D. Higgins, geologist with the Ohio State University expedition to the Horlick Mountains in 1961–62.

=== Treves Butte ===
84°43′S 114°20′W. A prominent, partly ice-covered butte, 2,100 metres (6,900 ft) high, immediately northwest of Discovery Ridge. Named by US-ACAN for Samuel B. Treves, geologist, who worked several seasons in Antarctica and who in the 1960–61 and 1961–62 seasons made investigations in the Ohio Range and other parts of the Horlick Mountains.

=== Discovery Ridge ===
84°44′S 114°06′W. A broad rock ridge with a rather flat summit area. It projects northwest from Buckeye Table, 2 nautical miles (3.7 km; 2.3 mi) northwest of Mount Glossopteris. The name was suggested by William E. Long, geologist of the Ohio State University expedition to the Horlick Mountains in 1960–61 and 1961–62. The first tillite and the first Devonian brachiopods were discovered by the expedition on this ridge, hence the name.

=== Otago Spur ===
84°45′S 114°10′W. A small spur projecting northward from the Buckeye Table, west of Discovery Ridge, Ohio Range. Mapped by USGS from surveys and United States Navy aerial photographs, 1958–59. The spur was studied by a NZARP geological party, 1983-84, and named after Otago University, the alma mater of Jonathan Aitchison, a member of the field party.

=== Quartz Pebble Hill ===
84°44′S 113°59′W. A flat-topped elevation on the north escarpment of Buckeye Table, Ohio Range. The hill is located where Discovery Ridge joins the main escarpment. The rock that forms the hill is composed of sandstone and quartz pebble conglomerate. The name was suggested by William E. Long, geologist of the Ohio State University expedition, who worked in these mountains in 1960–61 and 1961–62.

=== Mount Glossopteris ===
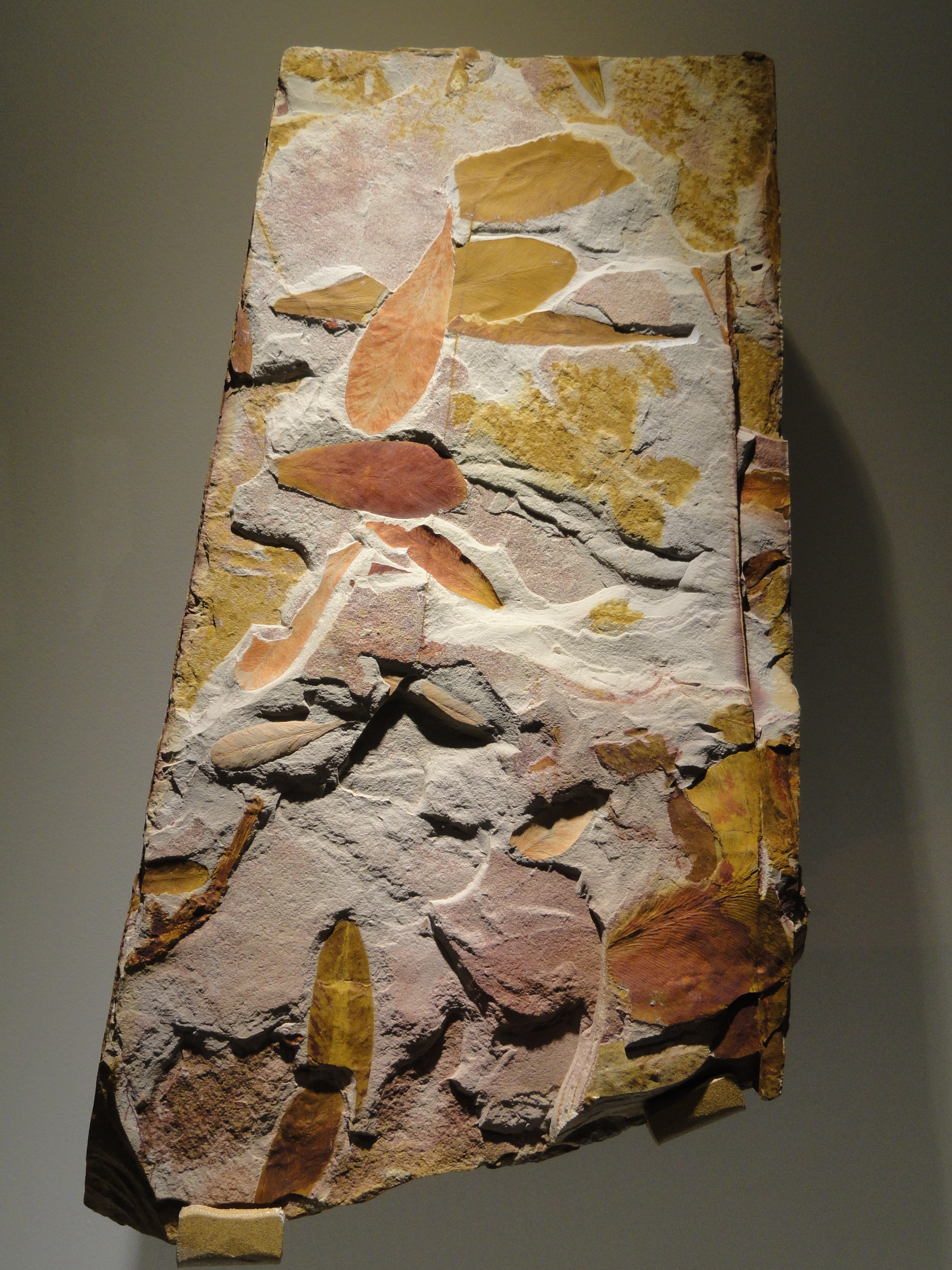
Glossopteris sp., seed ferns

84°44′S 113°43′W. A mainly ice-covered mountain, 2,865 metres (9,400 ft) high, which may be identified by the exposed horizontal bedding on the north face, located at the northeast end of Buckeye Table, Ohio Range. The name was proposed by USARP geologist William Long, a member of the Horlick Mountains Traverse party 1958–59, who, with Charles Bentley, Frederic Darling and Jack Long, climbed to the summit in Dec. 1958. Glossopteris is a prehistoric fernlike plant whose imprint was found on rocks of this mountain.

=== Canterbury Spur ===
84°43′S 113°45′W. A flat-topped ridge leading north from the north face of Mount Glossopteris, 1.3 nautical miles (2.4 km; 1.5 mi) east of Discovery Ridge. Mapped by USGS from surveys and United States Navy aerial photographs, 1958–59. The spur is named after the Canterbury Museum, Christchurch, N.Z., home of the National Antarctic Exhibition, Research and Reference Center. Geologists Jane Newman and Margaret Bradshaw of the Canterbury Museum worked on this ridge during the 1984–85 field season.

=== Museum Ledge ===
84°45′S 113°48′W. The ledge is a flat sandstone bed about 25 metres (82 ft) long and 9 to 12 metres (30 to 39 ft) wide exposed by erosion. The feature is a fossil locality. It contains excellently displayed fossil wood and is located on the southwest shoulder of Mount Glossopteris. The name alludes to the display of fossil wood found here and was suggested by William E. Long, geologist with the Ohio State University expedition who worked in these mountains in the 1960–61 and 1961–62 austral summers.

=== Salient Nunatak ===
84°42′S 113°24′W. A prominent cusp-shaped nunatak which stands out from the north side of Ohio Range, 3 nautical miles (5.6 km; 3.5 mi) northeast of Mount Glossopteris. Mapped by USGS from surveys and United States Navy aerial photographs, 1958–59. Named by the NZ-APC following geological work in the area by a NZARP field party, 1983–84.

== Eastern features ==
=== Mount Schopf ===
84°48′S 113°25′W. An elongated, mesa-like, mainly ice-covered mountain, 2,990 metres (9,810 ft) high,, located just east of Buckeye Table in the Ohio Range. Surveyed by the USARP Horlick Mountains Traverse party in December 1958. Named by US-ACAN for James M. Schopf, geologist, Coal and Geology Laboratory, USGS, Columbus, Ohio, who greatly assisted the field geologist by analyzing coal and related rock specimens from this mountain. Schopf was a member of the Horlick Mountains Party in the 1961–62 season.

=== Terrace Ridge ===
84°49′S 113°45′W. A mostly ice-free ridge, or spur, descending northwest from the summit area at the south end of Mount Schopf in the Ohio Range. Resistant sandstone strata predominate in the lower half of the slope of the ridge, forming a series of partly ice-covered terraces separated by scarps. The descriptive name was suggested by geologists of the Ohio State University expedition who worked in these mountains in the 1960–61 and 1961–62 seasons.

=== Mercer Ridge ===
84°50′S 113°45′W. A prominent, partly ice-free ridge that forms the southwest end of Mount Schopf. Named by US-ACAN after John H. Mercer (1922–87), glacial geologist, a member of the Ohio State University expedition to the Horlick Mountains in 1960–61. He returned to work in the Horlick Mountains, 1964–65, and later worked in the Antarctic, Alaska, Greenland, Argentina, Chile, and Peru; with the Institute of Polar Studies (now Byrd Research Center), Ohio State University, 1966–87.

=== Skinner Peak ===
84°46′S 112°53′W. A mainly snow-covered peak, over 2,600 metres (8,500 ft) high, on the spur that descends northeast from Mount Schopf in Ohio Range. Named by US-ACAN for Courtney J. Skinner, geological assistant and camp, manager with the Ohio State University expedition to the Horlick Mountains in 1961–62. Skinner visited Antarctica with USARP every summer season from 1961–62 to 1966–67.

=== Mirsky Ledge ===
84°37′S 111°40′W. A snow-covered ledge, or shelflike feature, about 10 nautical miles (19 km; 12 mi) northeast of Mount Schopf in the Ohio Range. Urbanak Peak and Iversen Peak rise above the ledge which is the apparent northeast extremity of the Horlick Mountains. The geology of these mountains was investigated by researchers from the Institute of Polar Studies, Ohio State University, 1958–62. The ledge was named by US-ACAN for Arthur Mirsky, Assistant Director of the Institute in that period.

=== Urbanak Peak ===
84°38′S 111°55′W. A peak with exposed rock on the north side, situated along Mirsky Ledge in the Ohio Range. Surveyed by the USARP Horlick Mountains Traverse party in Dec. 1958. Named by US-CAN for Richard L. Urbanak, meteorologist at Byrd Station in 1960.

=== Iversen Peak ===
84°37′S 111°26′W. A peak 3 nautical miles (5.6 km; 3.5 mi) east-northeast of Urbanak Peak at the northeast end of the Ohio Range. Surveyed by the USARP Horlick Mountains Traverse party in Dec. 1958. Named by US-ACAN for Frede Iversen, ionospheric physicist at Byrd Station in 1960.

== Sources ==
- Alberts, Fred G., ed. (1995), Geographic Names of the Antarctic (PDF) (2 ed.), United States Board on Geographic Names This article incorporates public domain material from websites or documents of the United States Board on Geographic Names.
- Faure, Gunter; Mensing, Teresa M. (21 September 2010), The Transantarctic Mountains: Rocks, Ice, Meteorites and Waterpage, Springer Science & Business Media, ISBN 978-90-481-9390-5
- Ohio Range, USGS: United States Geological Survey
- Swithinbank, Charles (December 1991), Potential Airfield Sites in Antarctica for Wheeled Aircraft (PDF), U.S. Army Corps of Engineers: Cold Regions Research & Engineering Laboratory

This article incorporates public domain material from websites or documents of the United States Geological Survey.
