= Geology of Antarctica =

Geologic composition of Antarctica

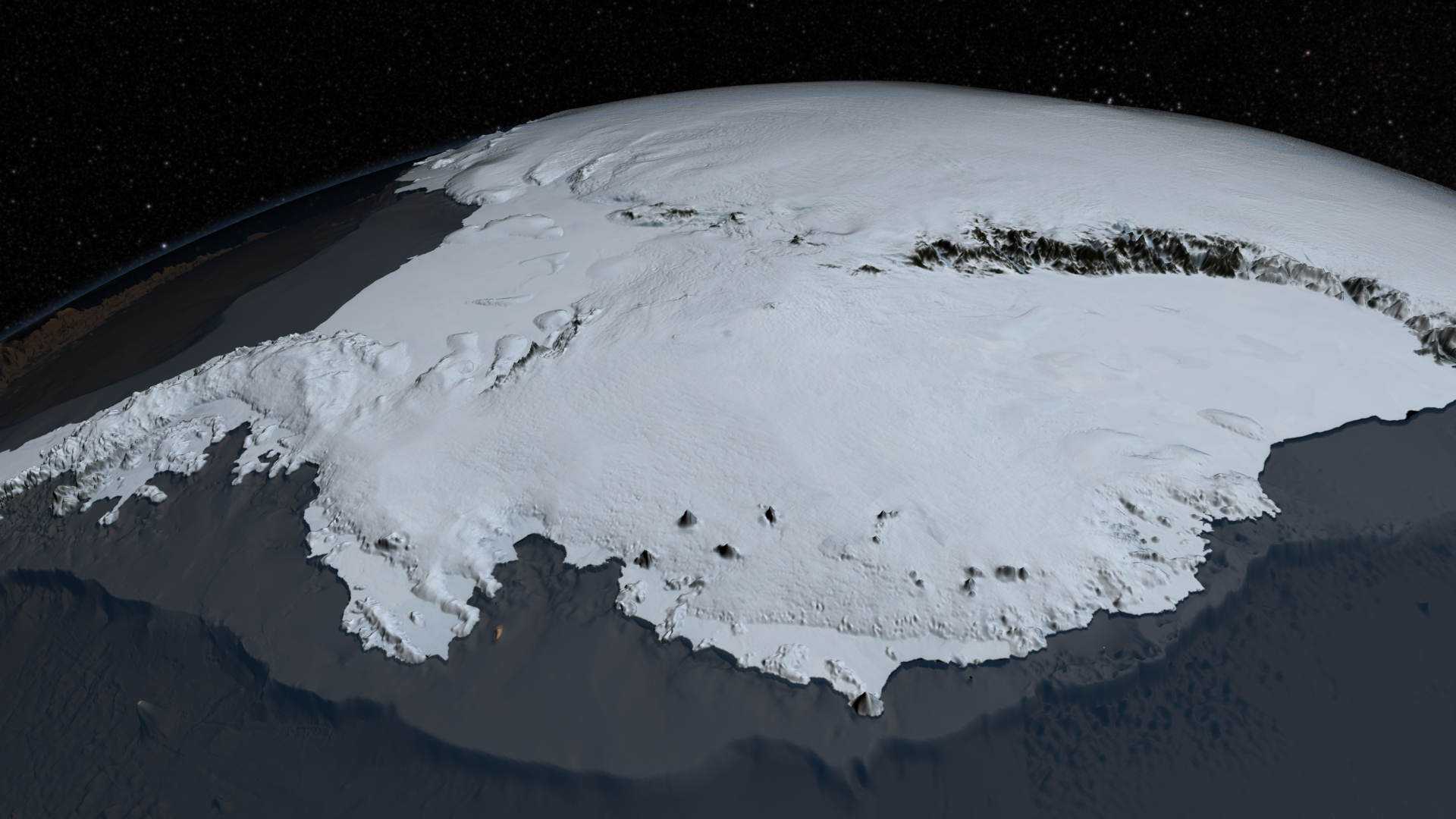
Study of the geology of Antarctica is hampered by the widespread ice cover

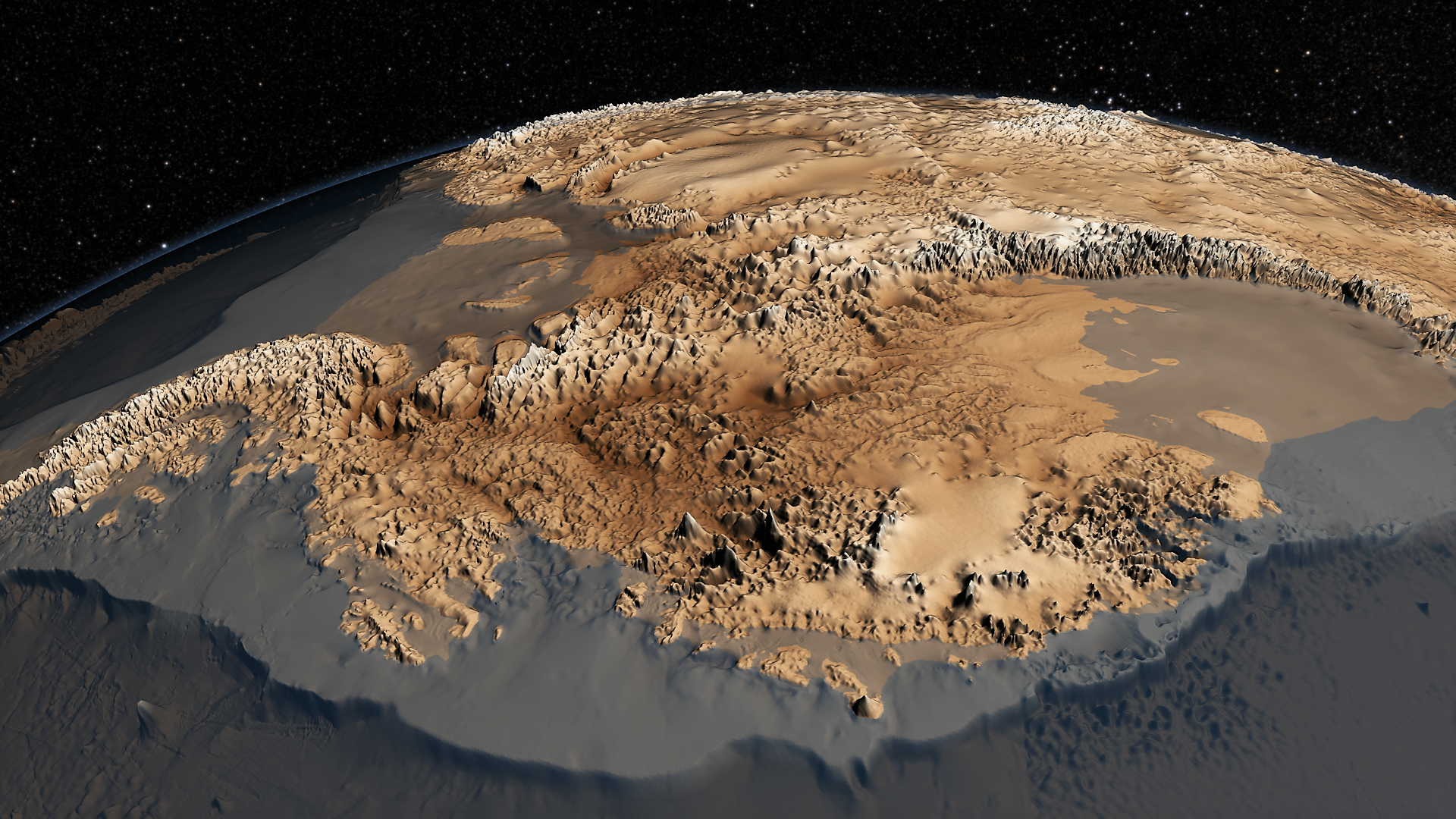
The bedrock topography of Antarctica (with the ice cover digitally removed), critical to understanding the motion of the continental ice sheets

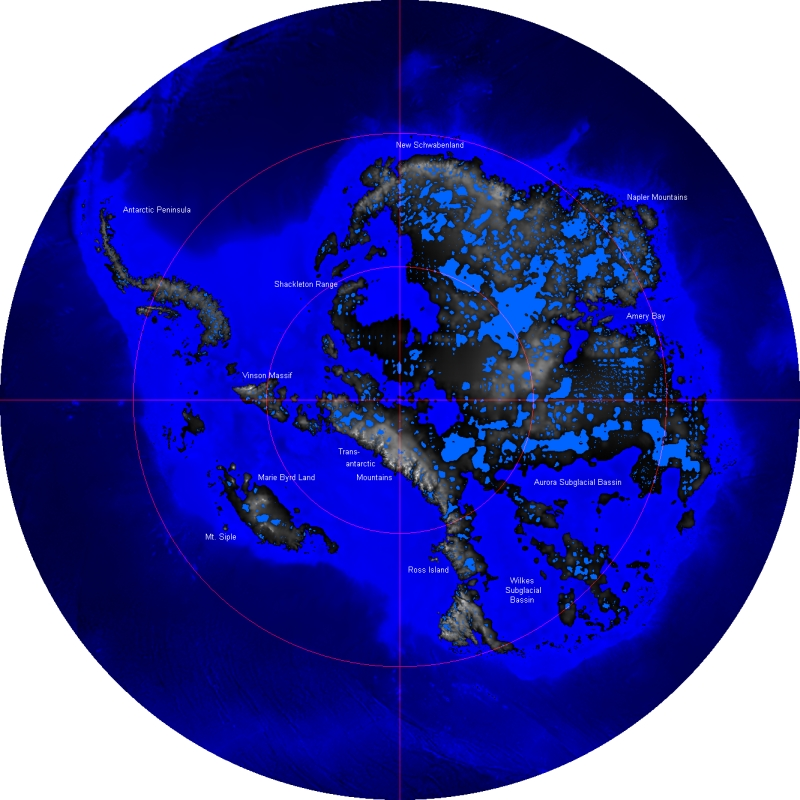
Antarctica without its ice cover. This map does not consider that sea level would rise because of the melted ice, or that the landmass would rise by several hundred meters over a few tens of thousands of years after the weight of the ice was no longer depressing the landmass.

Eastern Antarctica is to the right of the Transantarctic Mountains and Western Antarctica is to the left.

The geology of Antarctica covers the geological development of the continent through the Archean, Proterozoic and Phanerozoic eons.

The geological study of Antarctica has been greatly hindered by the fact that nearly all of the continent is continuously covered with a thick layer of ice. However, techniques such as remote sensing have begun to reveal the structures beneath the ice.

Geologically, West Antarctica closely resembles the Andes of South America. The Antarctic Peninsula was formed by uplift and metamorphism of sea-bed sediments during the late Paleozoic and the early Mesozoic eras. This sediment uplift was accompanied by igneous intrusions and volcanism. The most common rocks in West Antarctica are andesite and rhyolite volcanics formed during the Jurassic Period. There is also evidence of volcanic activity, even after the ice sheet formed, in Marie Byrd Land and Alexander Island. The only anomalous area of West Antarctica is the Ellsworth Mountains region, where the stratigraphy is more similar to that of the eastern part of the continent.

The West Antarctic Rift System, a major active rift valley, lies between West and East Antarctica. Its major phase of rapid, broad extension occurred in Cretaceous times, and involved the action of both normal and strike slip faults within West Antarctica and contiguous Zealandia. The rift is still active with slow movement of West Antarctica away from East Antarctica.

East Antarctica is geologically very old, dating from the Precambrian, with some rocks formed more than 3 billion years ago. It is composed of a metamorphic and igneous platform which is the basis of the continental shield. On top of this base are various more modern rocks, such as sandstones, limestones, coal, and shales laid down during the Devonian and Jurassic periods to form the Transantarctic Mountains. In coastal areas such as Shackleton Range and Victoria Land, some faulting has occurred.

More than 170 million years ago, Antarctica was part of the supercontinent Gondwana. Over time Gondwana broke apart and Antarctica as we know it today was formed around 35 million years ago.

== History of study ==
The frozen continent of Antarctica was the last continent humanity set foot on. The first documented landings made below the Antarctic Circle took place in 1820, when Admiral Fabian Gottlieb von Bellingshausen and the crew of the Vostok and Mirny, as part of the Russian Antarctic Expedition, made land at Peter I Island and Alexander Island.

Various explorers launched expeditions into the south polar region to assess its economic potential. Consequently, scientific research was a rather marginalized endeavour. The first person to report a fossil in the Antarctic was American naturalist James Eights in 1829, who landed probably on King George Island and found a fossilized log measuring 2.5 ft (0.76 m) in length and 4 in (100 mm) in diameter. Eights left the fossil where he found it, rather than collecting and formally describing it. The Ross expedition led by Captain James Clark Ross, from 1839 to 1842, discovered several Antarctic islands which are now known to be incredibly rich in fossils, most notably Seymour Island and Cockburn Island. Though he or his crew may have stumbled upon fossil material, they did not make note of it.

Much later, Captain Carl Anton Larsen and the crew of the Jason landed on Seymour Island over the summer of 1892 to 1893. He and his crew collected namely fossil shells, and Larsen's fossils (his crew traded theirs for tobacco) would eventually reach University of Oslo, and be formally described (a first for Antarctic fossils) by British paleontologists George Sharman and Edwin Tulley Newton in 1894. Larsen is most commonly accredited with being the first to collect an Antarctic fossil. Sharman and Newton studied nine specimens, of which two are conifer wood fragments, and seven are seashells. Of the shells, they classified five into Cucullaea donaldi; one into either "Cytherea" antarctica, Crassatella, or Donax (now Eurhomalea antarctica); and one to Natica.

Though paleontological work continued thereafter, the scientific exploration of Antarctica would come to the forefront only after the Antarctic Treaty System was put into effect after 1961, establishing the continent as a nature preserve for solely scientific endeavours, barring all onland commercial activity. Antarctica's paleontology and geology have expanded since then, but studying them is fraught with danger from extreme weather, deep crevasses, and avalanches.

== Archean ==
The East Antarctic Shield's oldest rocks include the Napier Complex, which outcrops in the Napier Mountains. These rocks are associated with the Napier orogeny and early stages of crustal formation (4000 Ma) in the Archean. The Vestfold Hills granulites are also Archaean.

== Proterozoic ==
The Mawson craton of East Antarctica and Australia preserves evidence of tectonic activity from the Archean through the Mesoproterozoic in the Terre Adelie, King George V Land and the Miller Range of the central Transantarctic Mountains.

The Late Proterozoic Rayner Complex outcrops in Enderby Land and western Kemp Land. The Rauer Islands terrane, composed of the Rauer Group granulite gneisses, are Late Proterozoic (1106 Ma). Numerous mafic dykes are present in the Vestfold Hills and Napier Complex, and were emplaced between about 1200 to 1400 Ma. Massive charnockite bodies are present in the East Antarctica complex Proterozoic mobile belts, indicating a batholith intruded the supracrustal basement gneiss around 1000 Ma. In the Borg Massif region of western Dronning Maud Land, Archaean granites are overlain by the Proterozoic Ritscherflya Supergroup. This supergroup is a sedimentary-volcanic sequence, in which the sedimentary Schumacherfjellet Formation and Högfonna Formation are intruded by the Grunehogna and Kullen mafic sills (838 Ma). The basaltic lavas of the Straumsnutane Formation (821 Ma) is the uppermost unit within the supergroup. To the east of the Ritscherflya Supergroup, lies the Proterozoic metamorphic terrane of H.U. Sverdrupfjella, which is composed of para- and orthogneisses. The Sør Rondane Mountains are underlain by Late Proterozoic metamorphic rocks of the Teltet-Vengen Group and the Nils Larsen Group gneisses, which are intruded by latest Proterozoic to Early Paleozoic plutonic rocks and dykes. Eastern Queen Maud Land includes the Late Proterozoic Lützow-Holm Complex of gneisses and granitic and granodioritic migmatic rocks, and the Yamato-Belgica Complex of syenite intrusions and low-pressure type metamorphism. These complexes are west of the Archaean Napier and Proterozoic Rayner complexes in Enderby Land. Precambrian gneisses, anorthosites, charnockites, and amphibolites characterize the Schirmacher Hills and Wohlthat Mountains in central Queen Maud Land.

Deposition during the Precambrian occurred in deep marine basins along the Pacific margin of Gondwana, the location of the present-day Transantarctic Mountains. These basin depositions were mainly deep-sea submarine fans. Key strata include the Turnpike Bluff Formation, the Beardmore Group, and the Skelton Group. The Beardmore orogeny occurred during the Late Proterozoic, and is recognized in the central Transantarctic Mountains, with Cambrian limestones unconformably overlying deformed strata. Associated igneous activity resulted in batholiths (620 Ma) and pyroclastics (633 Ma). These pyroclastics overlie argillite-graywacke sequences in Queen Maud Land, the Horlick Mountains, and the Thiel Mountains.

== Paleozoic ==
A carbonate platform developed along the palaeo-Pacific margin of Gondwana during the Cambrian, depositing the Shackleton Limestone on top of the Late Proterzoic argillaceous turbidite Goldie Formation. The Ross orogeny, during the early Paleozoic (Cambro-Ordovician), folded the Transantarctic Mountains along the margin of Gondwana, with associated metamorphism, and granitic batholith intrusions. Noted Cambrian-Ordovician outcrops include the Urfjell Group, Blaiklock Glacier Group, Heritage Group in the Ellsworth Mountains, Byrd Group, and the Skelton and Koettlitz groups. Silurian-Devonian rocks outcrop in the Transantarctic, Ellsworth and Pensacola Mountains, and include the Neptune Group, Horlick Formation, the Crashsite Quartzite, and the Taylor Group within the Beacon Supergroup.

During the Late Paleozoic icehouse, Antarctica was positioned over the South Pole while connected with the rest of Pangea. Antarctica underwent submergence and glaciation, and up to 375 m of Carboniferous and Permian glaciogenic rocks were deposited. This includes the Pagoda Formation within the Victoria Group of the Beacon Supergroup, a diamictite, sandstone and shale, within the Transantarctic Mountains.

During the Cambrian period, Gondwana had a mild climate. West Antarctica was partially in the northern hemisphere, and during this period large amounts of sandstones, limestones and shales were deposited. East Antarctica was at the equator, where sea-floor invertebrates and trilobites flourished in the tropical seas. By the start of the Devonian period (416 Ma) Gondwana was in more southern latitudes and the climate was cooler, though fossils of land plants are known from this time. Sand and silts were laid down in what is now the Ellsworth, Horlick and Pensacola Mountains. Glaciation began at the end of the Devonian period (360 Ma) as Gondwana became centered on the South Pole and the climate cooled, though flora remained. During the Permian period the plant life became dominated by fern-like plants such as Glossopteris, which grew in swamps. Over time these swamps became deposits of coal in the Transantarctic Mountains. Towards the end of the Permian period continued warming led to a dry, hot climate over much of Gondwana.

== Mesozoic ==
Pangea began to break up during the Triassic, while Gondwana moved northward taking Antarctica way from the South pole region. Subduction continued along the Pacific margin, and Triassic strata was deposited along the Transantarctic Mountains and the Antarctic Peninsula, including the Trinity Peninsula Group, the Legoupil Formation, and continued deposition of the Victoria Group within the Beacon Supergroup.

Gondwana rifting in the Middle Jurassic resulted in voluminous tholeiitic magmtic activity throughout the Transantarctic Mountains and the Antarctic Peninsula. By the Late Jurassic, the peninsula was a narrow magmatic arc, with back-arc basins and fore-arc basins, and represented by the Antarctic Peninsula Volcanic Group, and this activity continued into the Early Cretaceous. Antarctica was separated from Australia by the Early Cretaceous (125 Ma), and from New Zealand by the Late Cretaceous (72 Ma).

== Cenozoic ==
Antarctica was separated from South America at the Drake Passage by the Miocene, becoming isolated geologically, and thermal isolation resulted in a colder climate while the continent was centered at the South Pole. Large ice sheets were present by the Middle-Late Eocene

== See also ==
- Antarctic Plate
- Beacon Supergroup
- Beardmore orogeny
- Climate of Antarctica
- Dufek Intrusion
- East Antarctic Shield
- Erebus hotspot
- Geography of Antarctica
- Geology of Enderby Land
- Geology of the Antarctic Peninsula
- Gondwanide orogeny
- List of volcanoes in Antarctica
- Ross orogeny
- SWEAT (hypothesis)
- Tectonic evolution of the Transantarctic Mountains
