= Mount Chapman (Antarctica) =

Mountain in Marie Byrd Land, Antarctica

Coordinates: 82°35′S 105°55′W

Mount Chapman is a mountain in Antarctica. It is a triple-peaked mountain, 2,715 metres (8,907 ft) high, with very steep sides and a large rock cliff on its north side, situated at the western end of the Whitmore Mountains. It was named by the Advisory Committee on Antarctic Names for William H. Chapman of the U.S. Geological Survey (USGS), a cartographer with the Horlick Mountains Traverse (1958–59), who made a survey of the Whitmore Mountains on Jan. 2, 1959. Chapman spent several summer seasons in the Antarctic, including a survey in the Pensacola Mountains (1957–58) and the highly successful USGS Topo North-South Survey of the mountains bordering the west side of the Ross Sea and Ross Ice Shelf.
