= Ross orogeny =

Paleozoic mountain building event in Antarctica

The Ross orogeny was a mountain building event in Antarctica in the early Paleozoic. The ancestral (also termed proto-) Trans-Antarctic Mountains were uplifted earlier by the Beardmore orogeny but had eroded as a broad epicratonic sea flooded much of Antarctica in the Cambrian. Shallow water sedimentary rocks, platform carbonates and deepwater turbidites from this period are found in the mountain range. The Ross orogeny was one of the most extensive orogenic events in Antarctica, causing widespread plutonism and metamorphism. Bimodal magmatism and extension mark the beginnings of the orogeny, while during the later phase sedimentary rocks at the continental margin were deformed, metamorphosed and intruded with granite batholiths. Interpretations of rock forms in Antarctica during the 1980s suggested a westward-dipping subduction zone may have formed along the paleo-Pacific Ocean shoreline of East Antarctica. This is inferred from a large number of I-type and S-type granitoids which are similar to large circum-Pacific batholiths.

During the Late Cambrian to Early Ordovician, 450-520 Ma, Cambrian sediments within the Transantarctic Mountains were uplifted, folded, metamorphosed, and intruded by granitoid batholiths. Evidence of this origin may be found in the Shackleton Range, the Pensacola Mountains, Thiel Mountains, Horlick Mountains, and the Queen Maud Mountains.

== See also ==
- List of orogenies
- Geology of Antarctica
