= Hayes Peak (Thiel Mountains) =

Mountain in Antarctica

Coordinates: 85°20′S 89°18′W

Hayes Peak is an isolated, low rock peak, 2,060 metres (6,760 ft) high, rising above the ice surface just south of Bermel Escarpment, in the Thiel Mountains of Antarctica. The name was proposed by Peter Bermel and Arthur B. Ford, co-leaders of the United States Geological Survey (USGS) Thiel Mountains party which surveyed these mountains in 1960–61. The peak was named for Philip T. Hayes, a USGS geologist in the McMurdo Sound dry valley area during 1958–59.

== See also ==
- Mountains in Antarctica
