= Beardmore orogeny =

The Beardmore orogeny was a mountain building event in the Neoproterozoic affecting what is now Antarctica. The event is preserved in the Trans-Antarctic Mountains, potentially in the Shackleton Range and by argillite-greywacke series in the Horlick Mountains, Queen Maud Land and the Thiel Mountains. Upright folds, asymmetric overturned or recumbent isoclinal folds first identified by Elliott in 1975 was interpreted in 1992 by Edmund Stump as indicative of compressive and convergent tectonic activity.

The orogeny is expressed as an unconformity in the Transantarctic Mountains, between folded Late Proterozoic strata and overlying Early or Middle Cambrian sediments. This Late Precambrian event occurred between 660 and 580 Ma.

== See also ==
- Ross orogeny
- List of orogenies
- Geology of Antarctica
