= Hercules Dome =

Hercules Dome (86°S 105°W) is a large ice dome between the Thiel Mountains and the Horlick Mountains in Antarctica. The feature was first mapped by the United States Geological Survey from U.S. Navy aerial photographs taken 1959–60. It was further delineated by the Scott Polar Research Institute – National Science Foundation – Technical University of Denmark airborne aerial radio echo sounding program, 1967–79, and named after the Lockheed LC-130 Hercules aircraft which was used on all echo sounding flights from 1969. The dome is notable for its unusually high number of subglacial lakes.
