= Conus hendersoni =

Conus hendersoni Temporal range: Late Miocene

Scientific classification
- Kingdom: Animalia
- Phylum: Mollusca
- Class: Gastropoda
- Subclass: Caenogastropoda
- Order: Neogastropoda
- Superfamily: Conoidea
- Family: Conidae
- Genus: Conus
- Species: C. hendersoni

Binomial name
- Conus hendersoni Marwick, 1931

Species of sea snail

Conus hendersoni is a fossil species of sea snail, a marine gastropod mollusk in the family Conidae, the cone snails, cone shells or cones.

== Distribution ==
This marine species is only found in the fossil state in New Zealand. The species became extinct in the latest Miocene in response to the terminal Miocene glaciation of West Antarctica
