= Long Hills =

Hills in the Horlick Mountains of Antarctica

- Location within Antarctica

Geography
- Continent: Antarctica
- Area: Marie Byrd Land
- Range coordinates: 85°18′S 118°45′W
- Parent range: Horlick Mountains

The Long Hills (85°18′S 118°45′W) are a group of hills and rock outcroppings about 6 nautical miles (11 km; 6.9 mi) in extent, located midway between the Wisconsin Range and the Ohio Range in the Horlick Mountains of Antarctica.

== Discovery and naming ==
The Long Hills were mapped by the United States Geological Survey (USGS) from surveys and United States Navy aerial photographs, 1958–60. They were named by the United States Advisory Committee on Antarctic Names (US-ACAN) for William E. Long, a geologist with the Horlick Mountains Traverse, 1958–59, and also a member of the Ohio State University expedition to the Horlick Mountains in 1960–61 and 1961–62.

== Location ==
The Long Hills are in the Horlick Mountains to the east of the Wisconsin Range. Features include McCarthy Valley, Knack Point, Todd Ridge, Peters Butte and Victor Cliff. The Spencer Nunatak, Widich Nunatak and Noble Nunatak are to the west of the hills. The Shimizu Ice Stream drains west-northwest from the area between Wisconsin Range and Long Hills to enter the south flank of Horlick Ice Stream.

== Features ==
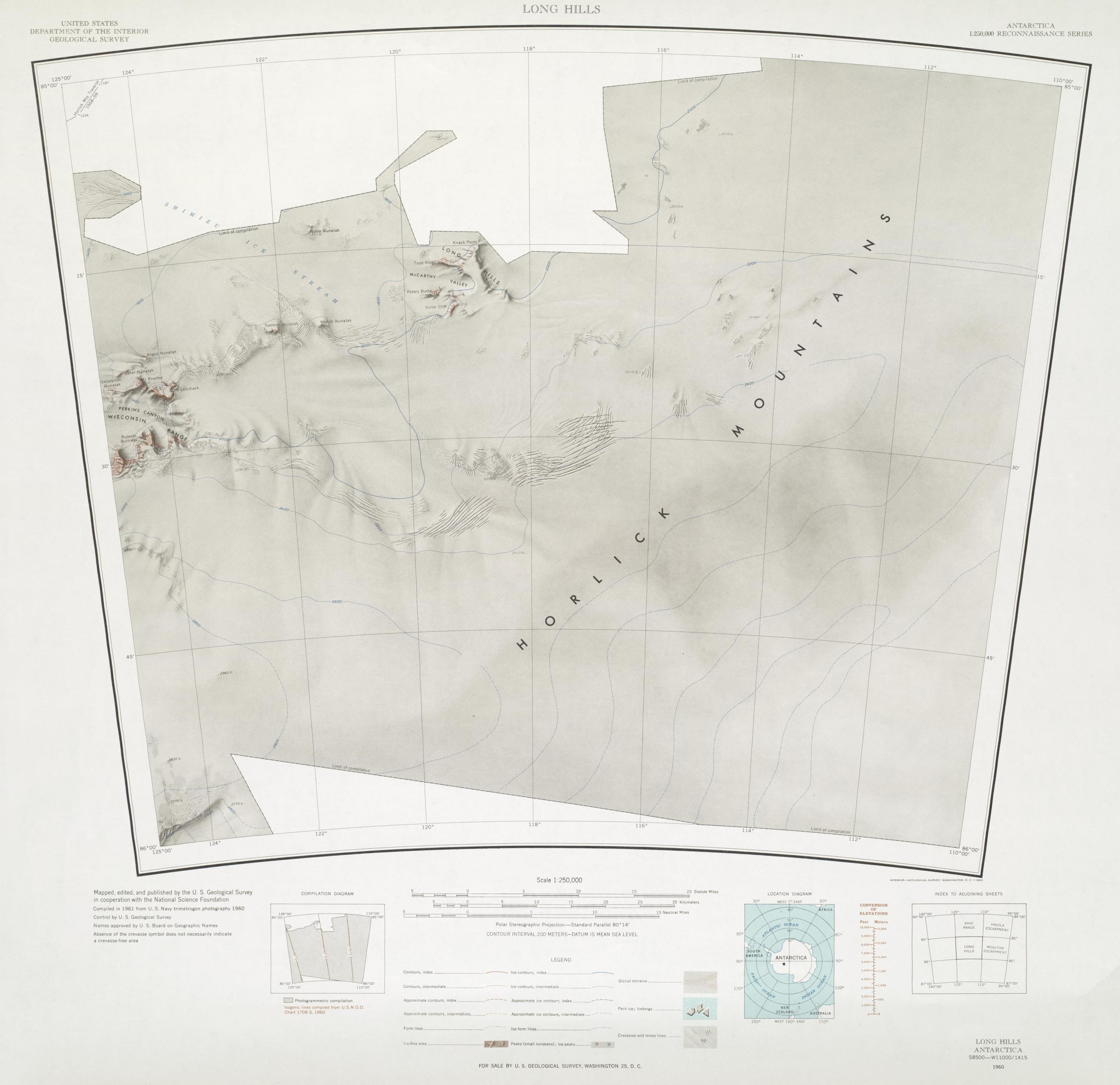
Long Hills in center north of map

The features of the Long Hills were mapped by the United States Geological Survey (USGS) from surveys and United States Navy aerial photography, 1958–60.

=== McCarthy Valley ===
85°18′S 119°20′W. An ice-filled valley, 3 nautical miles (5.6 km; 3.5 mi) long, between Peters Butte and Todd Ridge in the northwest part of Long Hills. Named by US-ACAN for James E. McCarthy, meteorological electronics technician at Byrd Station in 1960.

=== Knack Point ===
85°15′S 118°50′W. A point at the termination of a flat-topped spur which marks the north end of Long Hills. Named by US-ACAN for Joseph V. Knack, meteorologist at Byrd Station in 1958.

=== Todd Ridge ===
85°16′S 119°19′W. A narrow, flat-topped rock ridge at the northwest end of Long Hills. Named by US-ACAN for Marion N. Todd, aurora scientist at Byrd Station in 1958.

=== Peters Butte ===
85°19′S 119°32′W. A flat-topped, steep-sided rock butte on the south side of McCarthy Valley. Named by US-ACAN for Norman L. Peters, meteorologist at Byrd Station in 1958.

=== Victor Cliff ===
85°20′S 119°12′W. An abrupt rock cliff 1.5 nautical miles (2.8 km; 1.7 mi) long, which forms the southwest shoulder of Long Hills in the Horlick Mountains. Named by US-ACAN for Lawrence J. Victor, aurora scientist at Byrd Station in 1961.

=== Noble Nunatak ===
85°12′S 121°29′W. An isolated nunatak in the north part of the Hprlick Mountains, lying 8 nautical miles (15 km; 9.2 mi) north of Widich Nunatak along the north side of Shimizu Ice Stream. Named by US-ACAN for William C. Noble, meteorologist, Byrd Station winter party, 1958.

== Sources ==
- Alberts, Fred G., ed. (1995), Geographic Names of the Antarctic (PDF) (2 ed.), United States Board on Geographic Names This article incorporates public domain material from websites or documents of the United States Board on Geographic Names.
- Long Hills, USGS: United States Geological Survey

This article incorporates public domain material from websites or documents of the United States Geological Survey.
