= Sentinel Mountains Traverse =

The Sentinel Mountain Traverse, along with the Little America-Byrd Station Traverse and the Horlick Mountains Traverse, was one of three traverses across the continent of Antarctica— this one along the Sentinel Range— completed in 1958 by Dr. Charles Bentley (a geophysicist) and Dr. Verne Anderson (a glaciologist) and their team before and during the International Geophysical Year.
