= Bermel Escarpment =

Geologic feature in Antarctica

- Location within Antarctica

Highest point
- Elevation: 400 m (1,300 ft)
- Coordinates: 85°17′S 89°30′W

Geography
- Continent: Antarctica
- Region: Ellsworth Land
- Parent range: Thiel Mountains; Transantarctic Mountains

The Bermel Escarpment is a snow and rock escarpment, 15 nautical miles (28 km; 17 mi) long, extending from the base of the Ford Massif to King Peak, in the Thiel Mountains of Antarctica. The escarpment drops 300 to 400 metres (980 to 1,310 ft) from the Antarctic Plateau to the ice surface north of these mountains.

== Discovery and naming ==
The Bermel Escarpment was named by the United States Advisory Committee on Antarctic Names (US-ACAN) after Peter F. Bermel, a cartographer with the United States Geological Survey (USGS). Bermel was co-leader (with Arthur B. Ford) of the USGS Thiel Mountains party which surveyed the mountains in 1960–61, and also leader of USGS Topo East and Topo West, 1962–63, in which geodetic control was extended from the area of Cape Hallett to the Wilson Hills (Topo West), and from the foot of Beardmore Glacier through the Horlick Mountains (Topo East).

== Location ==
The Bermel Escarpment extends southeast from the Counts Icefall, which separates it from the Ford Massif to the north. It faces northeast, dropping from the polar plateau. Features from northwest to southeast include Taylor Outlier, Tabor Spur, Elliot Nunatak, Drake Nunatak and King Peak. A small massif extends the escarpment to the south and includes Mount Powell, Mount Walcott, Mount Wrather, Mendenhall Peak, Smith Knob and Nolan Pillar.

== Features ==
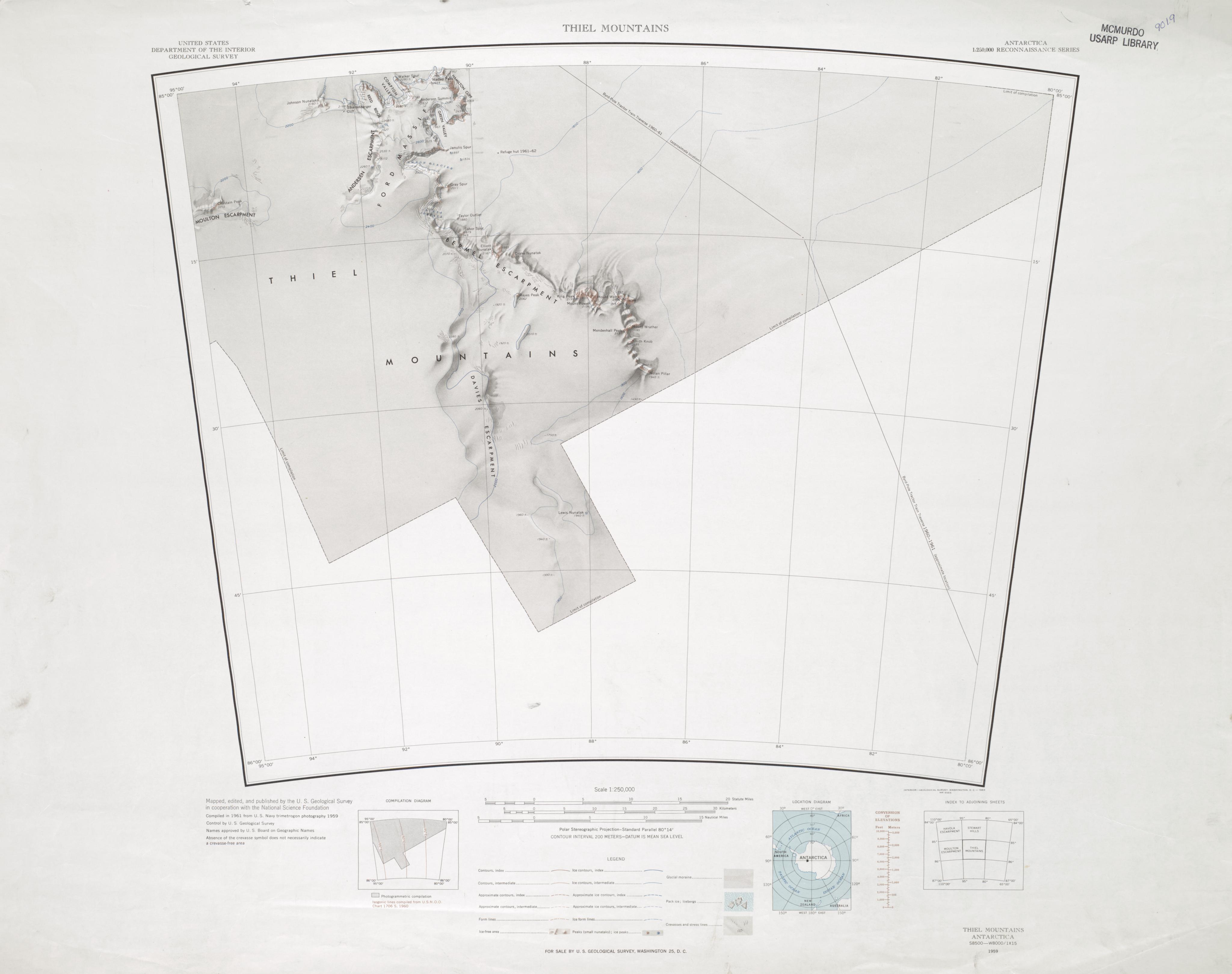
Thiel Mountains, Bermel Escarpment to the south center of the surveyed portion of the map

=== Taylor Outlier ===
85°13′S 90°19′W. A relatively isolated rock lying just in front of the west end of the Bermel Escarpment and about 1.5 nautical miles (2.8 km; 1.7 mi) east of the lower part of Counts Icefall. Mapped by USGS from surveys and United States Navy air photos, 1959-61. Named by US-ACAN for Alfred R. Taylor USGS geologist, a member of the United States Antarctic Research Program (USARP) Victoria Land Traverse, 1959-60.

=== Tabor Spur ===
85°15′S 90°14′W. A narrow, jagged spur jutting out from the front of the Bermel Escarpment between Taylor Outlier and Elliott Nunatak. The name was proposed by Peter Bermel and Arthur Ford, co-leaders of the USGS Thiel Mountains party which surveyed these mountains in 1960-61. Named for Rowland Tabor, USGS geologist with the 1961-62 Thiel Mountains party.

=== Elliot Nunatak ===
85°16′S 89°43′W. A large nunatak, 2,165 metres (7,103 ft) high, jutting out from the center of Bermel Escarpment. The name was proposed by Peter Bermel and Arthur Ford, co-leaders of the USGS Thiel Mountains party that surveyed these mountains in 1960-61. Named for Raymond L. Elliott, geologist with the Thiel Mountains party.

=== Drake Nunatak ===
85°17′S 89°20′W. A nunatak, 1,935 metres (6,348 ft) high, at the base of Bermel Escarpment and 1 nautical mile (1.9 km; 1.2 mi) east of Elliott Nunatak. The name was proposed by Arthur Ford and Peter Bermel, co-leaders of the USGS Thiel Mountains party of 1960-61. Named for Avery A. Drake, Jr., USGS geologist aboard the USS Glacier to the Thurston Island and Bellingshausen Sea area, 1960-61.

=== Hayes Peak ===
85°20′S 89°18′W. An isolated, low rock peak, 2,060 metres (6,760 ft) high, rising above the ice surface just south of Bermel Escarpment. The name was proposed by Peter Bermel and Arthur Ford, co-leaders of the USGS Thiel Mountains party which surveyed these mountains in 1960-61. Named for Philip T. Hayes, USGS geologist in the McMurdo Sound dry valley area, 1958-59.

=== King Peak ===
85°21′S 88°12′W. A rock peak, 2,200 metres (7,200 ft) high, surmounting the east extremity of the Bermel Escarpment, 1.5 nautical miles (2.8 km; 1.7 mi) west-northwest of Mount Powell The name was proposed by Peter Bermel and Arthur Ford, co-leaders of the USGS Thiel Mountains party which surveyed these mountains in 1960-61. Named for Clarence King, the first director of the US Geological Survey, 1879-81. Other peaks in the vicinity are named for subsequent directors of the USGS.

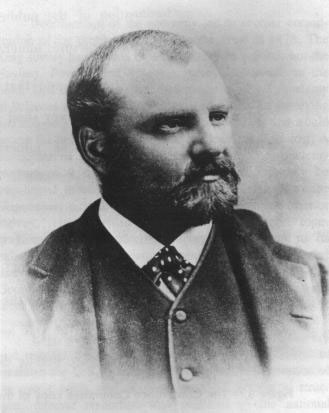
Clarence Rivers King (1842–1901)

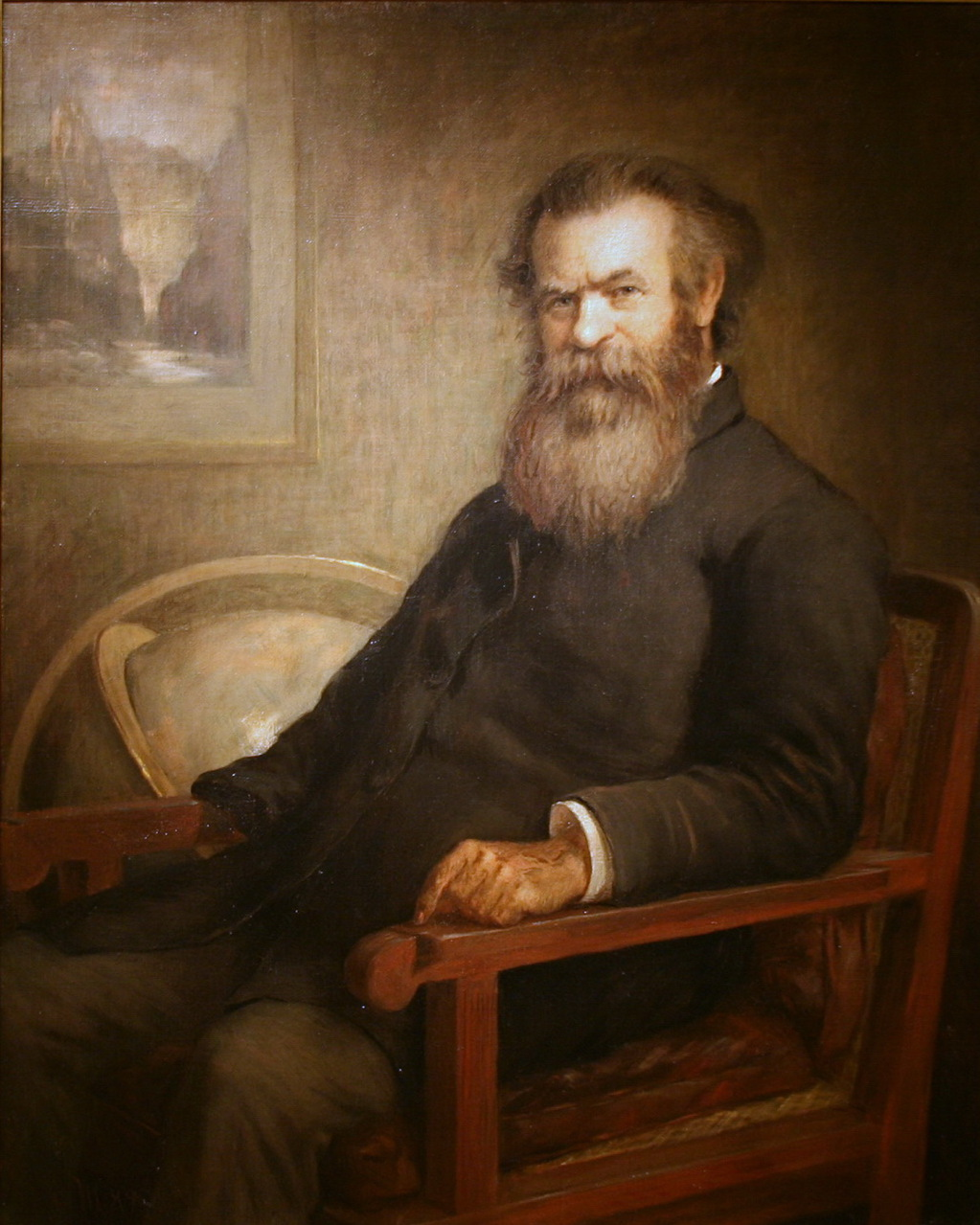
John Wesley Powell

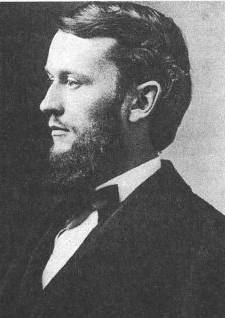
Charles Doolittle Wallcott in 1873

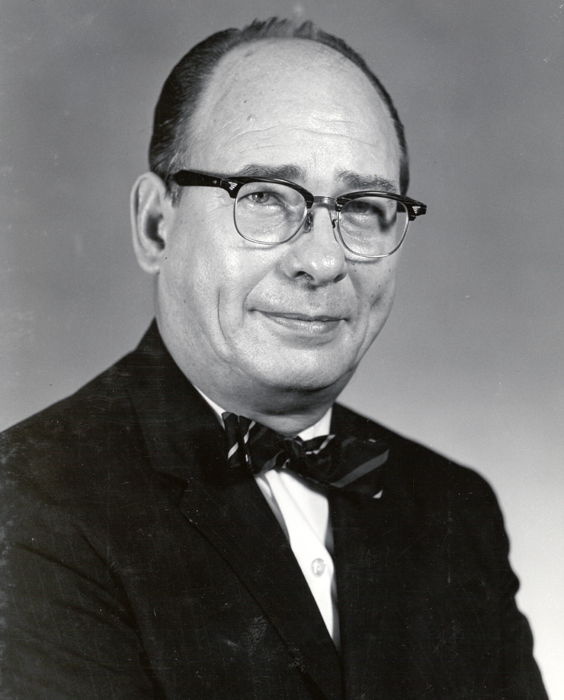
Vincent Ellis McKelvey

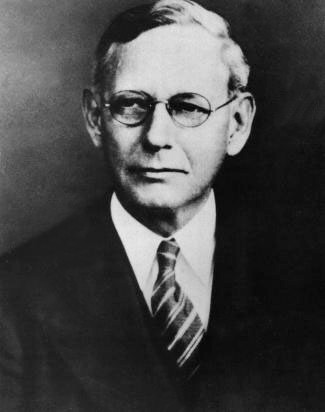
William Embry Wrather

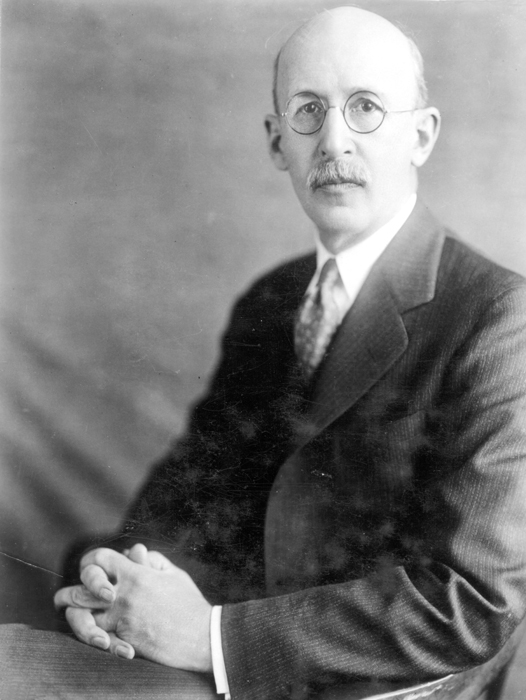
Walter Curran Mendenhall

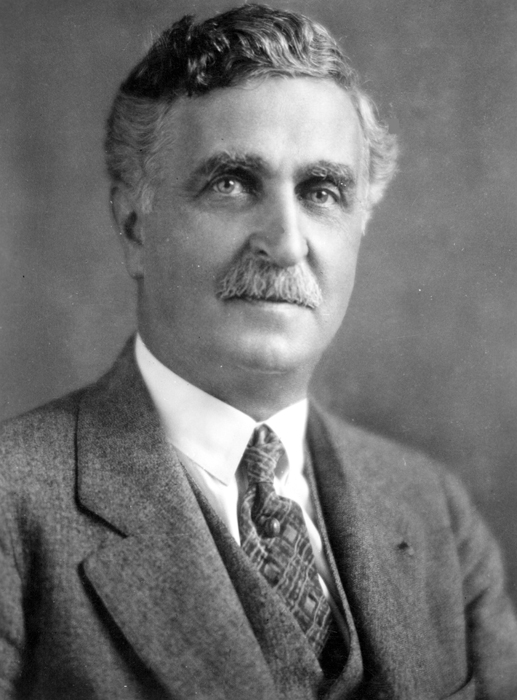
George Otis Smith

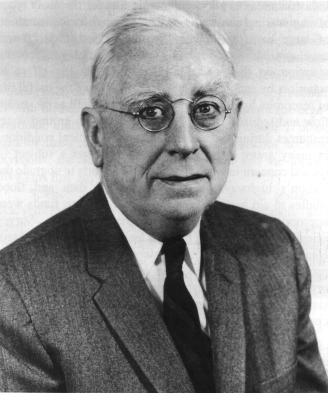
Thomas Brennan Nolan

== Southern massif ==
The names of features in this massif were proposed by Peter Bermel and Arthur Ford, co-leaders of the USGS Thiel Mountains party which surveyed these mountains in 1960-61.

=== Mount Powell ===
85°21′S 87°56′W. A prominent mountain, 2,195 metres (7,201 ft) high, sharing a small massif with King Peak which stands 1.5 nautical miles (2.8 km; 1.7 mi) west-northwest. Named for John Wesley Powell, second director of the United States Geological Survey, 1881-94.

=== Mount Walcott ===
85°21′S 87°23′W. A mainly ice-free mountain, 2,155 metres (7,070 ft) high, located 2.5 nautical miles (4.6 km; 2.9 mi) east of Mount Powell. Named for Charles Doolittle Walcott, third director of the United States Geological Survey, 1894-1907.

=== Mount McKelvey ===
85°21′S 87°18′W. A rocky, mostly ice-free peak, 2,090 metres (6,860 ft) high, situated less than 1 nautical mile (1.9 km; 1.2 mi) east of Mount Walcott in the eastern portion of the Thiel Mountains. Surveyed by the USGS Thiel Mountains party, 1960-61. Named by US-ACAN for Vincent E. McKelvey, ninth director of the U.S. Geological Survey, 1971-78. During this period numerous USGS geologic and topographic expeditions, for which he had administrative responsibility, were carried out in Antarctica.

=== Mount Wrather ===
85°23′S 87°14′W. Rock peak, 2,095 metres (6,873 ft) high, 2.5 nautical miles (4.6 km; 2.9 mi) south-southeast of Mount Walcott along the east margin of the Thiel Mountains. Named for William Embry Wrather, sixth director of the United States Geological Survey, 1943-56.

=== Mendenhall Peak ===
85°24′S 87°19′W. A peak, 2,130 metres (6,990 ft) high, 0.5 nautical miles (0.93 km; 0.58 mi) west of Mount Wrather. Named for Walter Curran Mendenhall, fifth director of the United States Geological Survey, 1931-43.

=== Smith Knob ===
85°25′S 87°15′W. A partly snow-covered rock peak, or knob, standing 1 nautical mile (1.9 km; 1.2 mi) south-southeast of Mendenhall Peak. Named for George Otis Smith, fourth director of the United States Geological Survey, 1907-30.

=== Nolan Pillar ===
85°27′S 86°52′W. A rock pinnacle, 1,940 metres (6,360 ft) high, standing 3 nautical miles (5.6 km; 3.5 mi) southeast of Smith Knob and marking the east extremity of the Thiel Mountains. Named for Thomas Brennan Nolan, seventh director of the United States Geological Survey, 1956-65.

== Sources ==
- Alberts, Fred G., ed. (1995), Geographic Names of the Antarctic (PDF) (2 ed.), United States Board on Geographic Names This article incorporates public domain material from websites or documents of the United States Board on Geographic Names.
- Thiel Mountains, USGS: United States Geological Survey

This article incorporates public domain material from websites or documents of the United States Geological Survey.
