= Shimizu Ice Stream =

Glaciological area in Marie Byrd Land, Antarctica

The Shimizu Ice Stream (85°11′S 124°0′W) is an ice stream in the Horlick Mountains, draining west-northwest from the area between the Wisconsin Range and Long Hills to enter the south flank of the Horlick Ice Stream.

Mapped by United States Geological Survey (USGS) surveys and U.S. Navy air photos from 1959–64, it was named by the Advisory Committee on Antarctic Names (US-ACAN) after Byrd Station glaciologist Hiromu Shimizu and later associate professor at the Institute of Low Temperature Science, Hokkaido, Japan.
