= Whitmore Mountains =

Mountain range in Antarctica

The Whitmore Mountains (82°35′S 104°30′W) are an isolated mountain range of the Transantarctic Mountains System, located in the Marie Byrd Land region of West Antarctica.

They consist of three mountains and a cluster of nunataks extending over 15 miles. The group was visited and surveyed on January 2, 1959, by William H. Chapman, cartographer with the Horlick Mountains Traverse Party (1958–59). The mountains were named by Chapman for George D. Whitmore, Chief Topographic Engineer of the United States Geological Survey (USGS), who was a member of the Working Group on Cartography of the Scientific Committee on Antarctic Research.

== Geological features ==
=== Linck Nunataks ===
Linck Nunataks (82°41′S 104°12′W) is a group of four small, ice-covered nunataks at the southeast end of the Whitmore Mountains. Three of the nunataks are together and aligned while the fourth lies 2.5 miles distant. They were visited and surveyed on January 2, 1959, by the Horlick Mountains Traverse Party. William H. Chapman, party surveyor, proposed the naming for M. Kerwin Linck, Chief of the Branch of Special Maps of the USGS.

=== Mount Radlinski ===
Mount Radlinski (82°31′S 103°34′W) is a rounded, smooth, ice-covered mountain (2,750 m) rising 4 miles southeast of Mount Seelig in the northeast part of the Whitmore Mountains. It was surveyed on January 2, 1959, by William H. Chapman, a member of the Horlick Mountains Traverse (1958–59). Mount Radlinski was named by Chapman after William A. Radlinski, United States Geological Survey (USGS) photogrammetrist, 1949–79; associate director of USGS, 1969–79; president, American Society of Photogrammetry, 1968; president, International Federation of Surveyors, 1973–75.

=== Mount Seelig ===
Mount Seelig (82°28′S 103°54′W) is the largest and highest mountain in the Whitmore Mountains, rising to 3,020 m (9,908 ft) at the northeast end of the group. It was surveyed on January 2, 1959, by William H. Chapman of USGS, a member of the Horlick Mountains Traverse Party, 1958–59. He named the mountain after Walter R. Seelig, Office of Polar Programs, National Science Foundation, 1960–86, who developed the USGS-NSF plan for topographic mapping of Antarctica; NSF Representative in Christchurch, N.Z., during eleven United States Antarctic Research Program (USARP) austral seasons between 1971 and 1986, including seventeen trips to Antarctica and adjacent seas; member, United States Advisory Committee on Antarctic Names, 1973–86; chairman, 1976–86.
