= Little America-Byrd Station Traverse =

The Little America-Byrd Station Traverse, along with the Horlick Mountains Traverse and the Sentinel Mountains Traverse, was a traverse of Antarctica performed by Dr. Charles Bentley before and during the International Geophysical Year of 1957-1958. In this instance, Dr. Bentley and his team traveled from the research station called Little America V to another called Byrd Station to measure gravity in the interior regions of the continent.
