= Ford Massif =

Mountain in Antarctica

- Location within Antarctica

Highest point
- Coordinates: 85°5′S 91°0′W

Geography
- Continent: Antarctica
- Region: Ellsworth Land
- Parent range: Thiel Mountains; Transantarctic Mountains

Ford Massif (85°5′S 91°0′W) is a broad, snow-topped massif 15 nautical miles (28 km; 17 mi) long and 5 nautical miles (9.3 km; 5.8 mi) wide, forming the major topographic landmark of the northern Thiel Mountains in Antarctica. The massif rises to 2,810 metres (9,220 ft), is essentially flat, and terminates in steep rock cliffs in all but the southern side.

== Discovery and naming ==
The Ford Massif was named by the United States Advisory Committee on Antarctic Names (US-ACAN) for geologist Arthur B. Ford of the United States Geological Survey (USGS). He was co-leader of the 1960–61 USGS Thiel Mountains survey party and leader of the 1961–62 geologic party to these mountains. Ford led geological parties working in the Pensacola Mountains in several austral seasons, 1962–63 to 1978–79.

== Location ==
The Ford Massif is the northern past of the Thiel Mountains, separated from the Bermel Escarpment by the Counts Icefall. The Moulton Escarpment lies to the west. Gray Spur is in the southeast of the massif, separated by the Aaron Glacier from Janulis Spur to its north. North of Janulis spur is Green Valley below Anderson Summit. Hamilton Cliff defines the northeast face of the massif, below Hadley peak to its west. Features to the west of Hadley Peak include Compton Valley, Reed Ridge, Streitenberger Cliff and the Johnson Nunataks. The Anderson Escarpment defines the southeastern face of the massif.

== Features ==
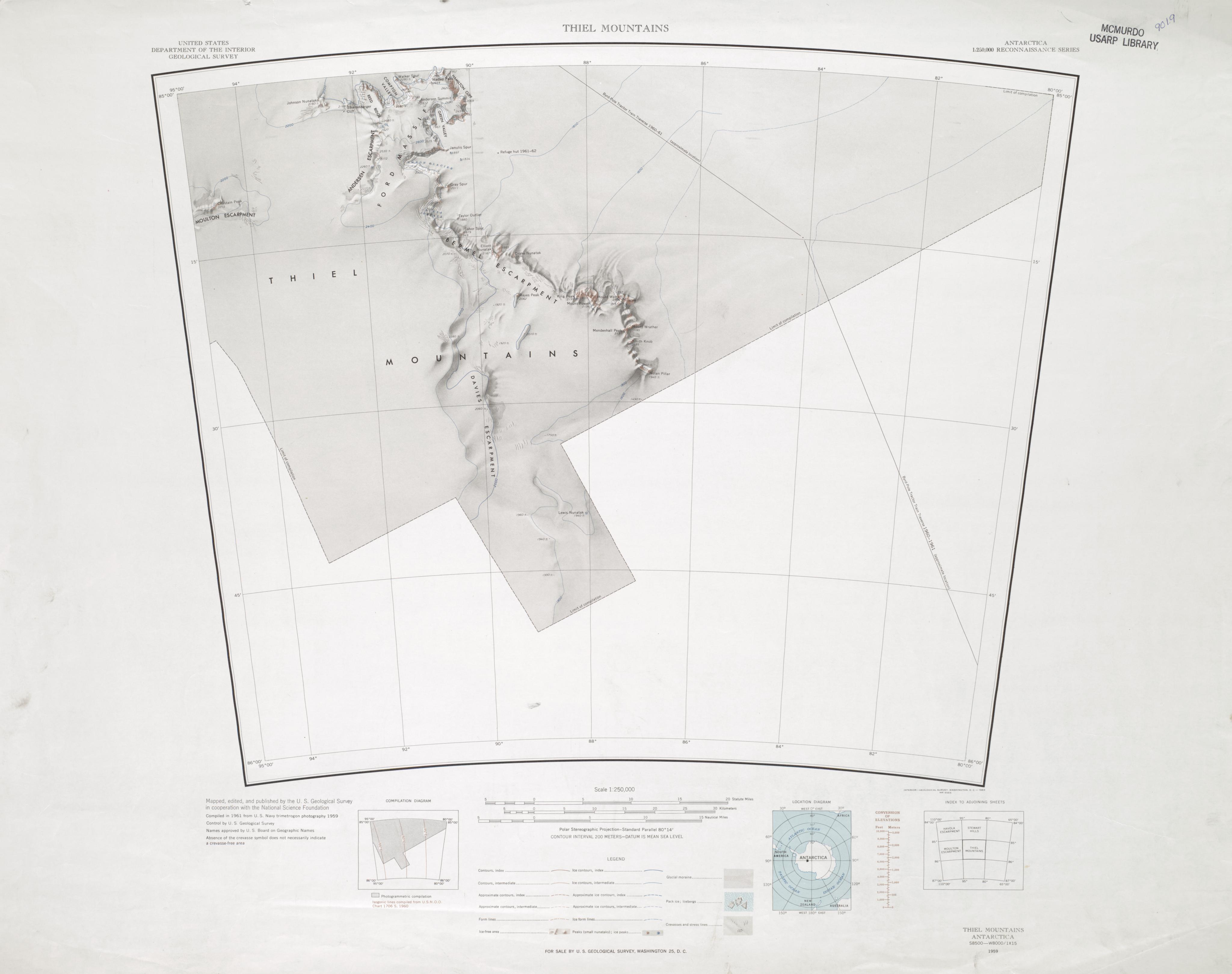
Thiel Mountains, Ford Massif to the northwest of the map

Features of the massif, anti-clockwise from the south, are:

=== Counts Icefall ===
85°13′S 90°48′W. A steep, heavily-crevassed icefall at the juncture of the Ford Massif and the west end of Bermel Escarpment. Surveyed by the USGS Thiel Mountains party, 1960-61. Named by US-ACAN for Lieutenant Commander William D. Counts, United States Navy, who lost his life in the crash of a Lockheed P-2 Neptune aircraft soon after take-off from Wilkes Station on Nov. 9, 1961.

=== Gray Spur ===
85°10′S 90°29′W. A rock spur between Aaron Glacier and Counts Icefall on the east side of Ford Massif. A small peak rises from the end of the spur. Mapped by the USGS Thiel Mountains party of 1960-61. Named by US-ACAN for James L. Gray, Aviation Machinist's Mate, United States Navy, who lost his life in a crash of a Lockheed P-2 Neptune aircraft soon after take-off from Wilkes Station, Nov. 9, 1961.

=== Aaron Glacier ===
85°08′S 90°40′W. Glacier 4 nautical miles (7.4 km; 4.6 mi) long, that drains east from the Ford Massif between Janulis Spur and Gray Spur. The name was proposed by Peter Bermel and Arthur Ford, co-leaders of the USGS Thiel Mountains party, 1960-61. Named for John M. Aaron, USGS geologist and member of the 1960-61 and 1961-62 field parties to the Thiel Mountains.

=== Janulis Spur ===
85°07′S 90°27′W. A rock spur which extends eastward from the Ford Massif between Green Valley and Aaron Glacier. The name was proposed by Peter Bermel and Arthur Ford, co-leaders of the USGS Thiel Mountains party which surveyed these mountains in 1960-61. Named for Lieutenant George Janulis, pilot with United States Navy Squadron VX-6, who flew the USGS party into the Thiel Mountains.

=== Green Valley ===
85°04′S 90°30′W. A steep-sided, ice-filled valley that indents the east side of Ford Massif just north of Janulis Spur. The name was proposed by Arthur Ford and Peter Bermel, co-leaders of the USGS Thiel Mountains party that surveyed these mountains in 1960-61. Named for David H. Green, camp assistant with the party.

=== Anderson Summit ===
85°03′S 90°53′W. The highest peak, 2,810 metres (9,220 ft) high, in the Thiel Mountains, on top of the Ford Massif and directly southeast of Walker Ridge. It is snow covered except for bare rock at the top. The name was proposed by Peter Bermel and Arthur Ford, co-leaders of the USGS Thiel Mountains party, 1960-61. The peak was climbed by Ford in 1961. Named for Charles A. Anderson, then chief geologist of the U.S. Geological Survey.

=== Hamilton Cliff ===
85°01′S 90°18′W. An imposing rock cliff that rises more than 600 metres (2,000 ft) and forms the northeast extremity of Ford Massif. The name was proposed by Peter Bermel and Arthur Ford, co-leaders of the USGS Thiel Mountains party which surveyed these mountains in 1960-61. Named for Warren B. Hamilton, USGS representative in charge of geologic studies in the McMurdo Sound dry valley area, 1958-59.

=== Hadley Peak ===
85°01′S 90°40′W. A peak, 2,660 metres (8,730 ft) high, surmounting the escarpment at the north edge of Ford Massif. The name was proposed by Peter Bermel and Arthur Ford, co-leaders of the USGS Thiel Mountains party which surveyed these mountains in 1960-61. Named for Jarvis B. Hadley of USCS, then Chief of the Branch of Regional Geology in the Eastern U.S. and administrator of USGS geology programs in Antarctica.

=== Walker Spur ===
85°01′S 91°12′W. A notable rock spur forming the east side of Compton Valley in the north part of the Ford Massif. The name was proposed by Peter Bermel and Arthur Ford, co-leaders of the USGS Thiel Mountains party which surveyed these mountains in 1960-61. Named for Capt. Joseph G. Walker, USMC, Squadron VX-6 pilot who made several flights in support of the USGS party in 1960-61.

=== Compton Valley ===
85°01′S 91°20′W. An ice-filled valley indenting the north side of Ford Massif between Reed Ridge and Walker Spur. Surveyed by the USGS Thiel Mountains party, 1960-61. Named by US-ACAN for Lieutenant (j-g.) Romuald P. Compton, United States Navy, who lost his life in the crash of a Lockheed P-2 Neptune aircraft soon after take-off from Wilkes Station, Nov. 9, 1961.

=== Reed Ridge ===
85°02′S 91°40′W. A flat-topped, snow-covered ridge extending northwest for 3 nautical miles (5.6 km; 3.5 mi) from the west part of the Ford Massif. The ridge forms the west wall of Compton Valley. Mapped by USGS from surveys and U.S. Navy air photos, 1959-61. Named by US-ACAN for Dale R. Reed, ionospheric scientist at Ellsworth Station in 1958 and Byrd Station in 1960.

=== Streitenberger Cliff ===
85°03′S 92°07′W. An abrupt rock and ice cliff 1.3 nautical miles (2.4 km; 1.5 mi) west of Reed Ridge, along the northwest margin of the Ford Massif. The name was proposed by Peter Berrnel and Arthur Ford, co-leaders of the Thiel Mountains party which surveyed the area in 1960-61. Named for Staff Sergeant Fred W. Streitenberger, USMC, navigator of the Squadron VX-6 plane crew that flew the USGS party into the Thiel Mountains, and also to several other mountain ranges during the summer of 1960-61.

=== Johnson Nunataks ===
85°02′S 92°30′W. Two isolated rock crags, or nunataks, which lie 3 nautical miles (5.6 km; 3.5 mi) west of Reed Ridge, along the northwest side of Ford Massif. The name was proposed by Peter Bermel and Arthur Ford, co-leaders of the USGS Thiel Mountains party which surveyed these mountains in 1960-61. Named for USGS geologist Charles G. Johnson who, working from aboard the Glacier, studied the Beaufort Island and Cape Bird areas during 1958-59.

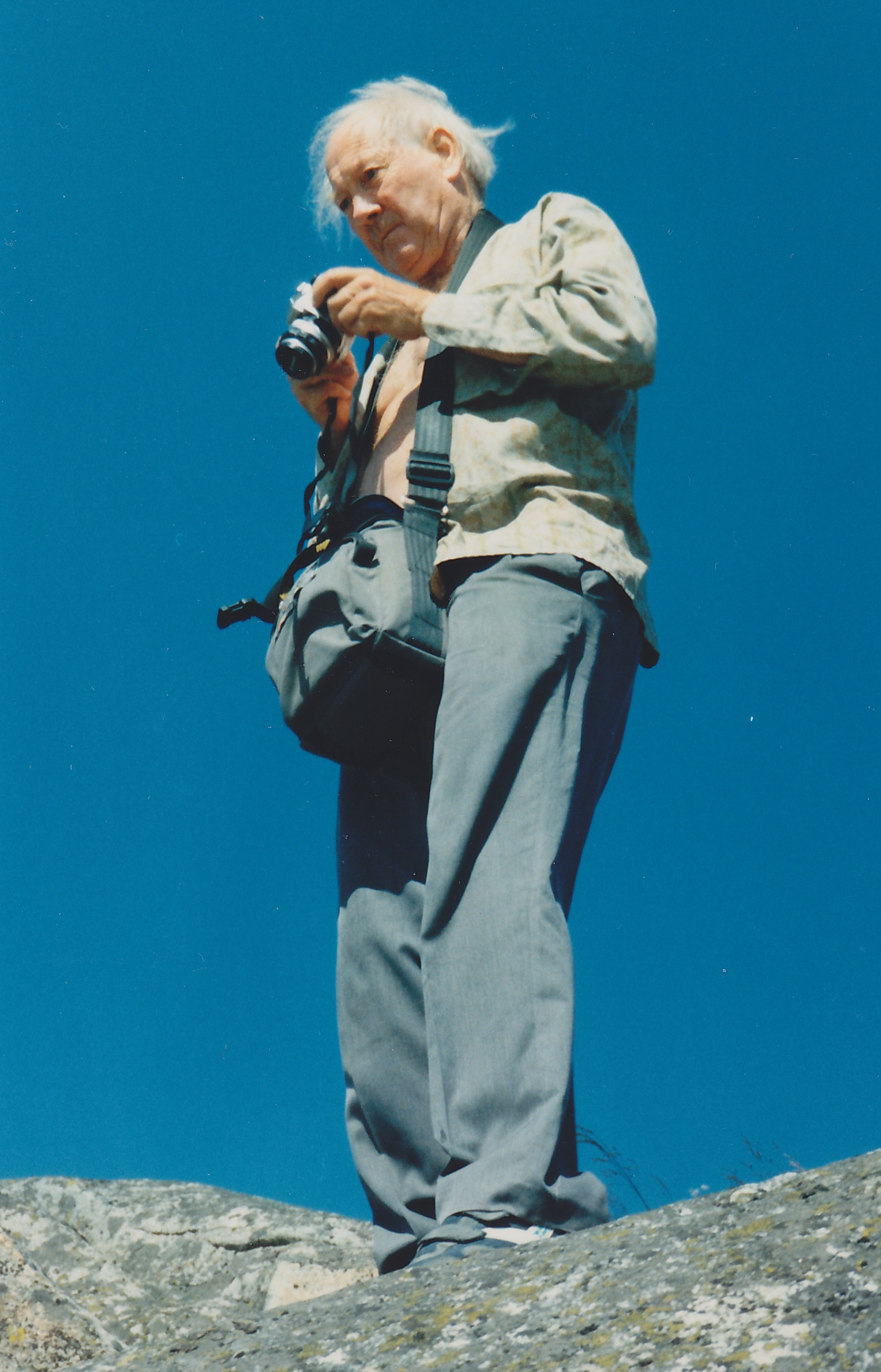
Bjørn G. Andersen on photo hunt. (Photo by Knut Andersen)

=== Anderson Escarpment ===
85°08′S 91°37′W. A steep rock and snow escarpment located south of Reed Ridge on the west side of the Ford Massif. The name was proposed by Peter Bermel and Arthur Ford, co-leaders of the USGS Thiel Mountains party, 1960-61. Named for Bjørn G. Andersen (1924–2012), Norwegian professor of geology and glaciology at the University of Oslo, who was a member of the 1960-61 and 1961-62 USGS field parties to the Thiel Mountains.

== Sources ==
- Alberts, Fred G., ed. (1995), Geographic Names of the Antarctic (PDF) (2 ed.), United States Board on Geographic Names This article incorporates public domain material from websites or documents of the United States Board on Geographic Names.
- Thiel Mountains, USGS: United States Geological Survey

This article incorporates public domain material from websites or documents of the United States Geological Survey.
