= Tectonic evolution of the Transantarctic Mountains =

The tectonic evolution of the Transantarctic Mountains appears to have begun when Antarctica broke away from Australia during the late Cretaceous and is ongoing, creating along the way some of the longest mountain ranges (at 3500 kilometers) formed by rift flank uplift and associated continental rifting. The Transantarctic Mountains (TAM) separate East and West Antarctica. The rift system that formed them is caused by a reactivation of crust along the East Antarctic Craton. This rifting or seafloor spreading causes plate movement that results in a nearby convergent boundary which then forms the mountain range. The exact processes responsible for making the Transantarctic Mountains are still debated today. This results in a large variety of proposed theories that attempt to decipher the tectonic history of these mountains.

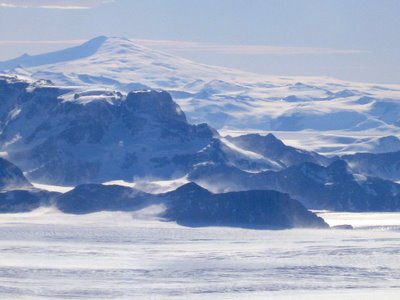
Front range of the Transantarctic Mountains

== Three main causes for uplift ==
1. Thermal mechanisms, such as mantle plumes and magma injections into the crust, cause rift zones and thermal expansion of the mountain belt.
2. Convergence of crustal material occurs when the rift zone pushes the West Antarctic plate into the much stronger East Antarctic plate.
3. Flexural uplift is a mechanical process where a tectonic plate is broken by a deep normal fault resulting in the footwall uplifting rock. This uplift is associated with isostatic rebound.

=== West Antarctic Rift System influence ===
The West Antarctic Rift System is located just west of the Transantarctic Mountains, and is considered to be the largest influence in the history of the Transantarctic Mountains. The rift is a broad region where slow extension has occurred for approximately 100 My. Until recently the influence of this rift was debated because little was known about the region due to a lack of geological and geophysical data.

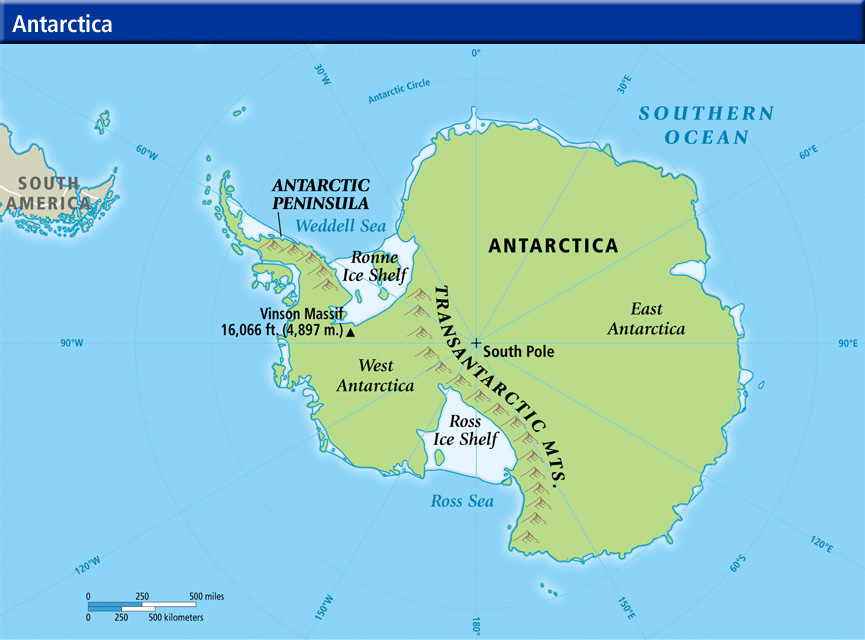
Map of Transantarctic Mountains

== Uplift history ==
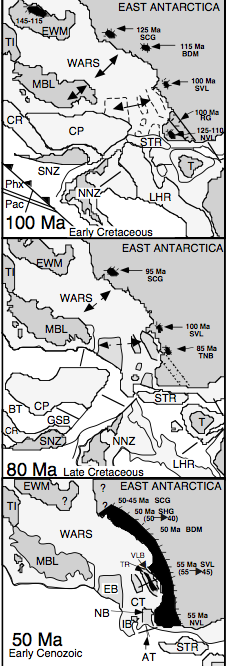
Paleogeographic reconstruction of WARS and TAM

Breakup of the super-continent Gondwana started in the early Jurassic around 184 million years ago (Ma), but Antarctica did not break up from Australia until the late Cretaceous (80 Ma). Just before the breakaway in the Late Jurassic and Early Cretaceous, rifting began to occur near the soon-to-be Transantarctic Mountains. It is uncertain whether this first episode of rifting caused any uplift of the mountain range. Some researchers say this episode is a reactivation of rift that was formed during the Gondwanide Orogeny, but it has never been proven. This event was followed by low-angle extensional faulting along the East Antarctic plate. No uplift occurred during this initial phase of faulting due to counteracting erosional events. Shortly after, during the Mid Cretaceous (100 Ma), the West Antarctic Rift System began to form. Certain models show that the rapid rifting and intense thermal forces are due to a shallow (50 km depth) lithosphere-asthenosphere boundary under the Transantarctic Mountains. Rifting in this area is still going on today. Such a long period of rifting leads to uplift due to prolonged lateral heat conduction in the mountain belt. This is backed by seismic evidence. Initial surface uplift began approximately 55 Ma during the Early Cenozoic era.

Rift flank uplift occurs when the crust on the side of a rift zone converges with a stronger crust, usually resulting in crustal thickening and a subduction zone. Flexural uplift is not typically associated with rift flank uplift, but in the case of the Transantarctic Mountains it occurs at the same lithospheric boundary, here in conjunction with thermal expansion of the mountain belt, resulting in very rapid surface uplift. This phenomenon explains the steep slope and high elevation of the present mountains. The rate of uplift from the Mid-Cenozoic to the present has been slowly decreasing due to slower tectonic processes.

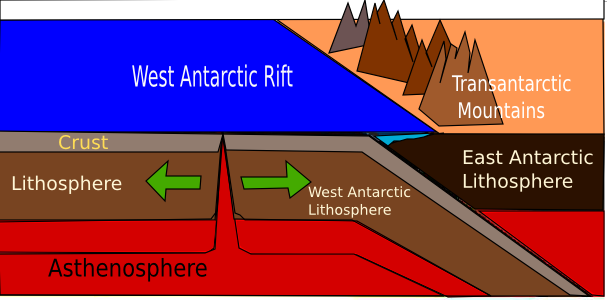
Rift zone and convergent boundary that form the Transantarctic Mountains

=== Regional tectonic events associated with exhumation ===
1. The separation of Antarctica and Australia occurs during the Early Cretaceous exhumation.
2. During the Late Cretaceous exhumation, the Antarctic plate was extended east and west due to low-angle faulting.
3. Seafloor spreading and propagation of the Adare Trough into the continental crust (East Antarctic craton) at the rift zone caused a rise in the East Antarctic lithosphere during the early Cenozoic exhumation.

== Exhumation history ==
In order to have surface uplift of rock, the uplift rate must exceed the rate of exhumation. In other words, the speed at which rock is moving up needs to be greater than the impact of erosion at the surface. The Transantarctic Mountains have experienced three major episodes of exhumation, also known as denudation. Geologists are able to estimate the timing of these events, as well as uplift events, using the method of Apatite fission track dating. During the Cretaceous period (65-145 Ma), two separate denudation events occurred. Both episodes, one Early Cretaceous and the other Late Cretaceous, were great enough to cancel out any possible surface uplift. The third denudation event took place during the Early Cenozoic. During the Cenozoic rock was uplifted anywhere from 7 km to 10 km, with the highest elevation toward the front of the range and decreasing as one moves inland.
