= Horlick Mountains =

Mountain range in Marie Byrd Land, Antarctica

- Location within Antarctica

Geography
- Continent: Antarctica
- Area: Marie Byrd Land
- Range coordinates: 85°23′S 121°00′W

The Horlick Mountains (85°23′S 121°00′W) are a mountain group in the Transantarctic Mountains of Antarctica, lying eastward of Reedy Glacier and including the Wisconsin Range, Long Hills and Ohio Range.

== Discovery and naming ==
The mountains were discovered in two observations by the Byrd Antarctic Expedition, 1933–35, one by Kennett L. Rawson from a position in about 83°05′S 105°19′W, at the end of his southeastern flight of November 22, 1934, and another by Quin Blackburn in December 1934, from positions looking up Leverett Glacier and Albanus Glacier. Portions of the Wisconsin Range are recorded in aerial photography obtained by United States Navy Operation Highjump, 1946–47. The entire mountain group was surveyed by USARP parties and was mapped from United States Navy aerial photographs, 1959–64. They were named by Admiral Richard E. Byrd for William Horlick, of the Horlick's Malted Milk Corp., a supporter of the Byrd expedition of 1933–35.

== Extent ==
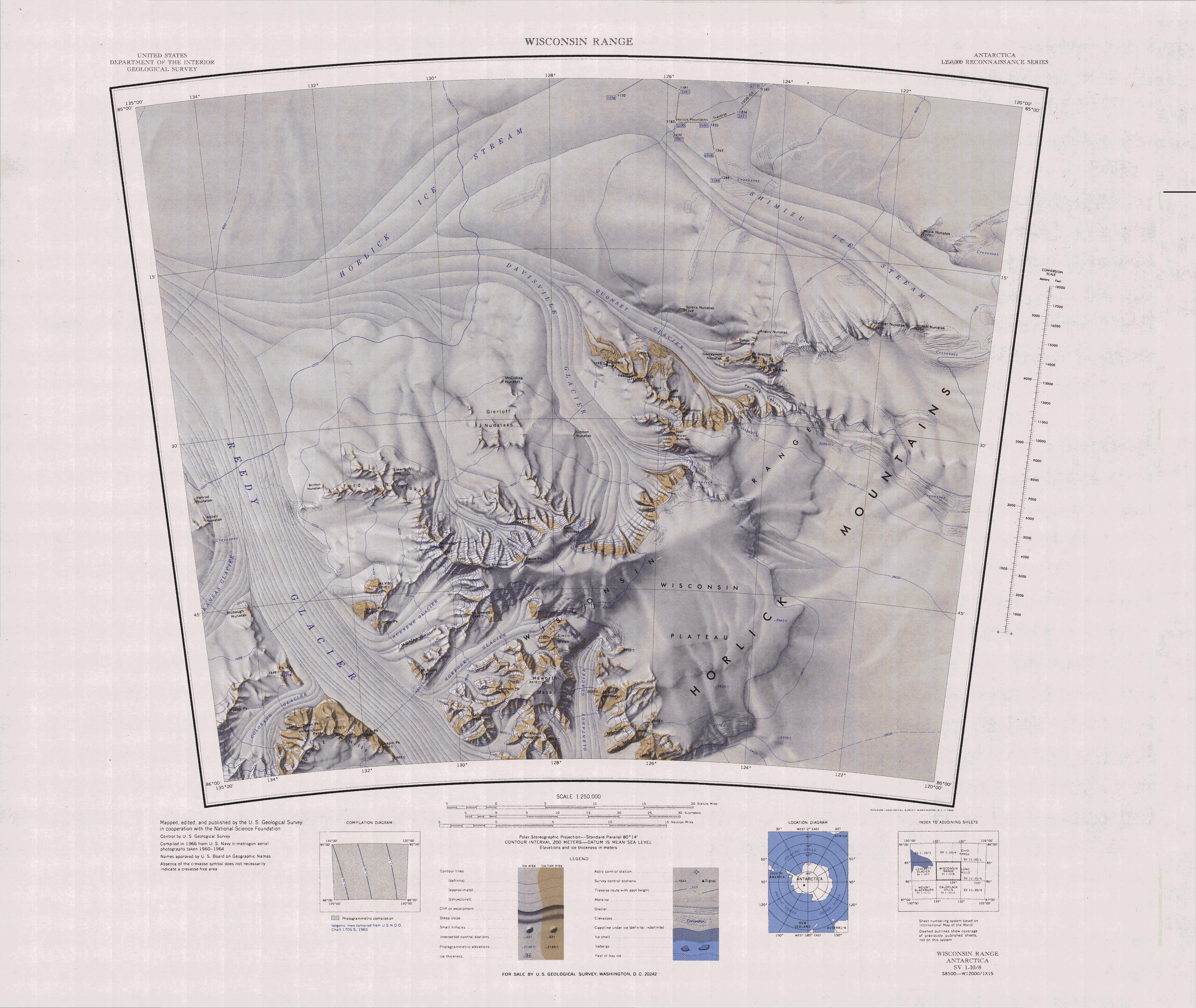
Wisconsin Range

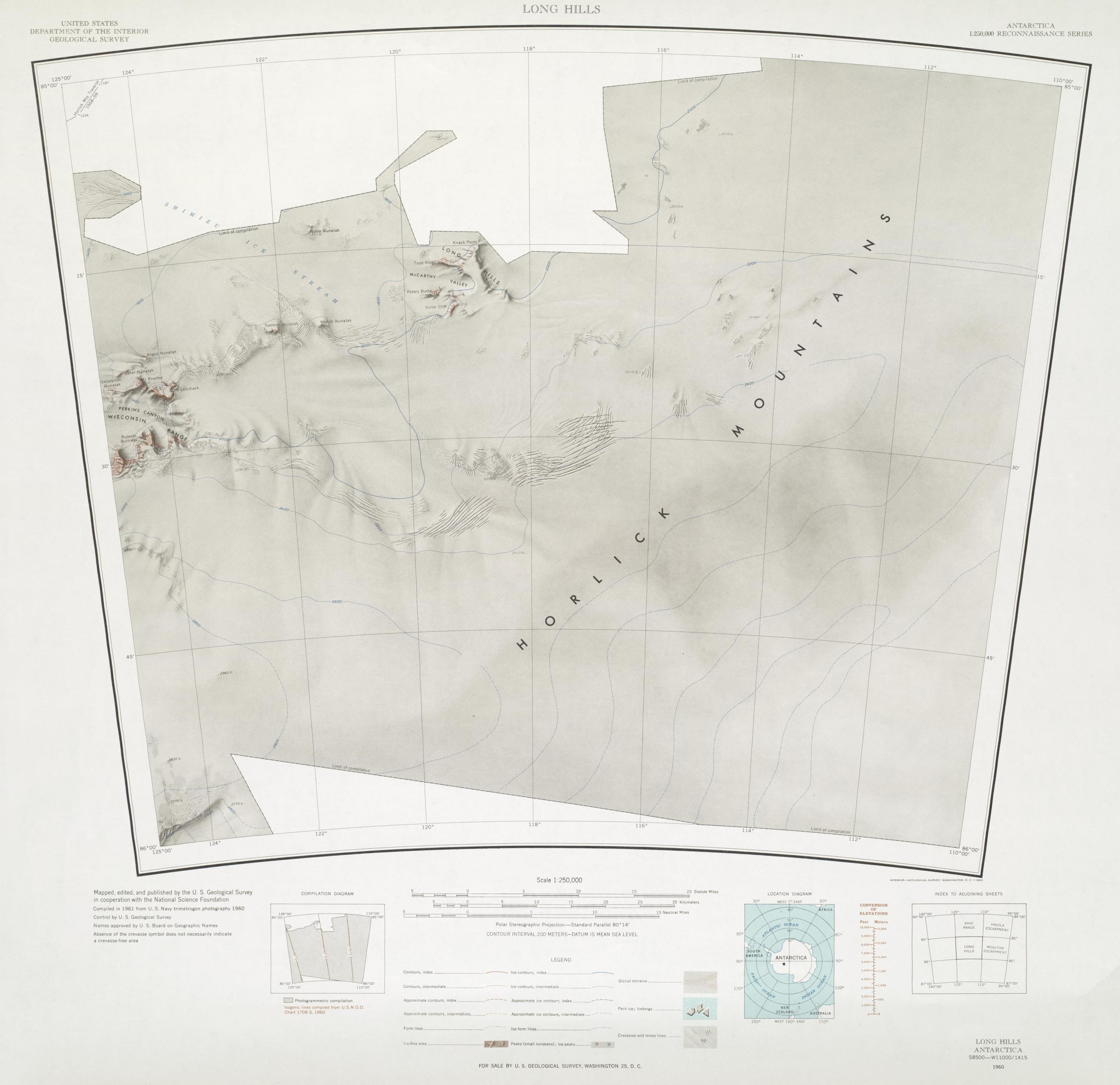
Long Hills in center north of map

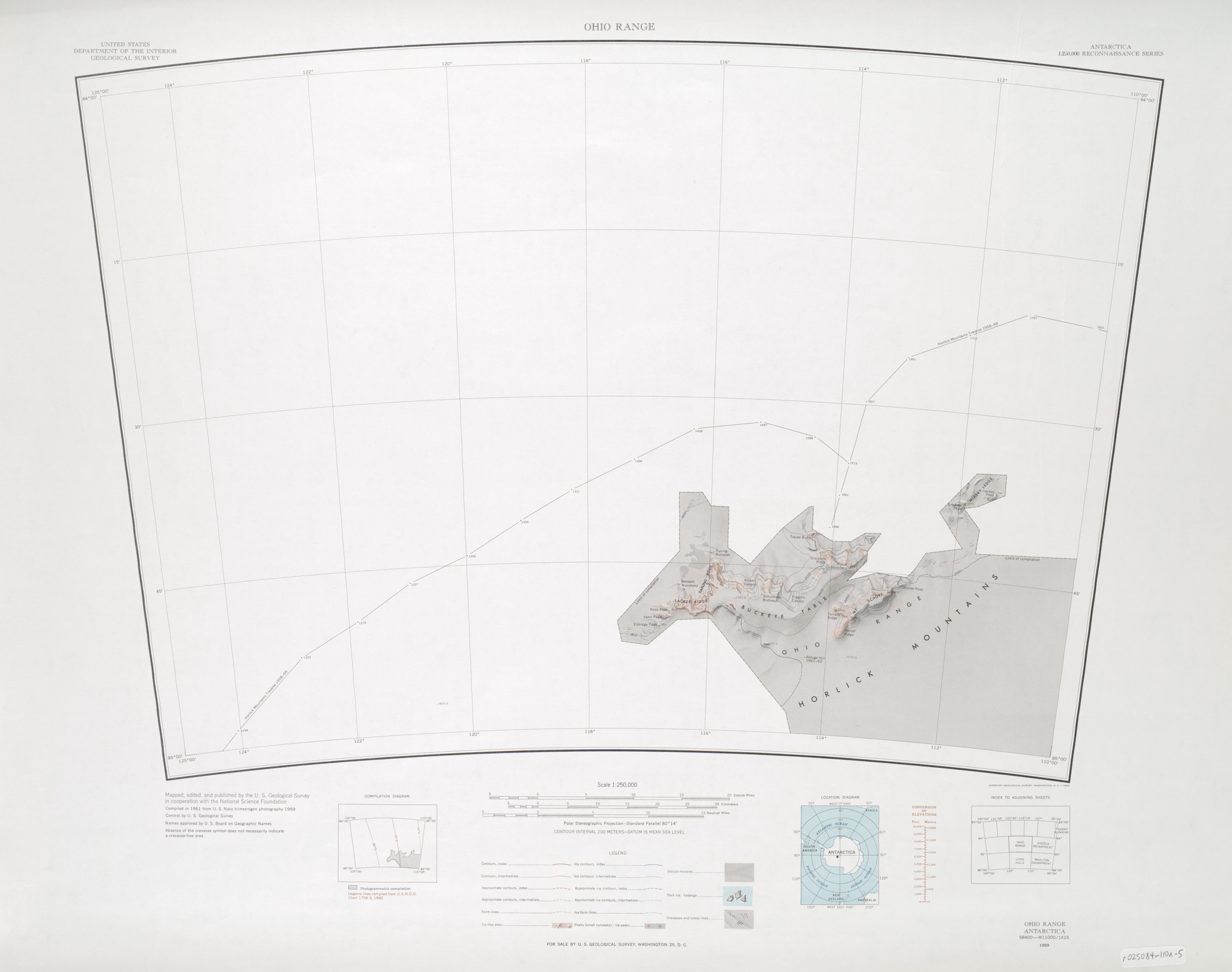
Ohio Range in southeast of map

According to Mirsky's 1969 geologic map of the Horlick Mountains, the Horlick Mountains extend eastward from the mouth of the Reedy Glacier to Iversen Peak at the eastern tip of the Ohio Range, about 235 kilometres (146 mi), and include the Wisconsin Range, Long Hills and Ohio Range. A 2005 map by Davis and Blankenship shows the Horlick Mountains including the eastern part of the Queen Maud Mountains and most of the Wisconsin Range. To their east the Hercules Dome separates the Horlick Mountains from the Thiel Mountains to the east.

== Major glaciers ==
- Reedy Glacier (85°30′S 134°00′W), a major glacier in Antarctica, over 100 nautical miles (190 km; 120 mi) long and 6 to 12 nautical miles (11 to 22 km; 6.9 to 13.8 mi) wide, descending from the polar plateau to the Ross Ice Shelf between the Michigan Plateau and Wisconsin Range in the Transantarctic Mountains. It marks the limits of the Queen Maud Mountains on the west and the Horlick Mountains on the east.
- Horlick Ice Stream (85°17′S 132°00′W), a large ice stream on the featureless ice surface to the north of the main mass of the Horlick Mountains, draining west-southwestward, paralleling these mountains, to enter the lower portion of the Reedy Glacier.
- Shimizu Ice Stream (85°11′S 124°0′W) is an ice stream in the Horlick Mountains, draining west-northwest from the area between Wisconsin Range and Long Hills to enter the south flank of Horlick Ice Stream.

== Ranges ==
- Wisconsin Range (85°45′S 125°00′W), is a major mountain range of the Horlick Mountains, comprising the Wisconsin Plateau and numerous glaciers, ridges and peaks bounded by the Reedy Glacier, Shimizu Ice Stream, Horlick Ice Stream and the interior ice plateau.
- Long Hills (85°18′S 118°45′W), a group of hills and rock outcroppings about 6 nautical miles (11 km; 6.9 mi) in extent, located midway between the Wisconsin Range and the Ohio Range.
- Ohio Range (84°45′S 114°00′W), a range about 30 nautical miles (56 km; 35 mi) long and 10 nautical miles (19 km; 12 mi) wide, extending west-southwest – east-northeast from Eldridge Peak to Mirsky Ledge. The range forms the northeast end of the Horlick Mountains and consists primarily of a large snow-topped plateau with steep northern cliffs and several flat-topped ridges and mountains. The highest point, 2,990 metres (9,810 ft), is the summit of Mount Schopf.

== Sources ==
- Alberts, Fred G., ed. (1995), Geographic Names of the Antarctic (PDF) (2 ed.), United States Board on Geographic Names This article incorporates public domain material from websites or documents of the United States Board on Geographic Names.
- Faure, Gunter; Mensing, Teresa M. (21 September 2010), The Transantarctic Mountains: Rocks, Ice, Meteorites and Waterpage, Springer Science & Business Media, ISBN 978-90-481-9390-5

This article incorporates public domain material from websites or documents of the United States Geological Survey.
