= West Antarctica =

Part of Antarctica that lies within the Western Hemisphere

Coordinates: 79°S 100°W

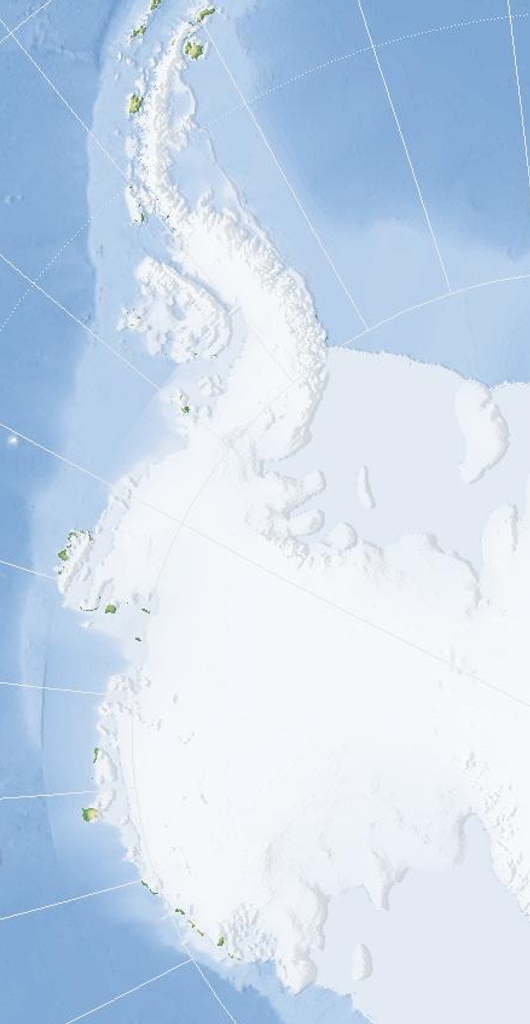
Almost blank map of West Antarctica

Labeled map of Antarctica, with West Antarctica on the left.

West Antarctica, or Lesser Antarctica, one of the two major regions of Antarctica, is the part of that continent that lies within the Western Hemisphere, and includes the Antarctic Peninsula. It is separated from East Antarctica by the Transantarctic Mountains and is covered by the West Antarctic Ice Sheet. It lies between the Ross Sea (partly covered by the Ross Ice Shelf), and the Weddell Sea (largely covered by the Filchner-Ronne Ice Shelf). It may be considered a giant peninsula, stretching from the South Pole towards the tip of South America.

West Antarctica is largely covered by the Antarctic ice sheet, but there have been signs that climate change is having some effect and that this ice sheet may have started to shrink slightly. Over the past 50 years, the west coast of the Antarctic Peninsula has been – and still is – one of the most rapidly warming parts of the planet, and the coasts of the Peninsula are the only parts of West Antarctica that become (in summer) ice-free. These constitute the Marielandia Antarctic tundra and have the warmest climate in Antarctica. The rocks are clad in mosses and lichens that can cope with the intense cold of winter and the short growing-season.

== Location and description ==
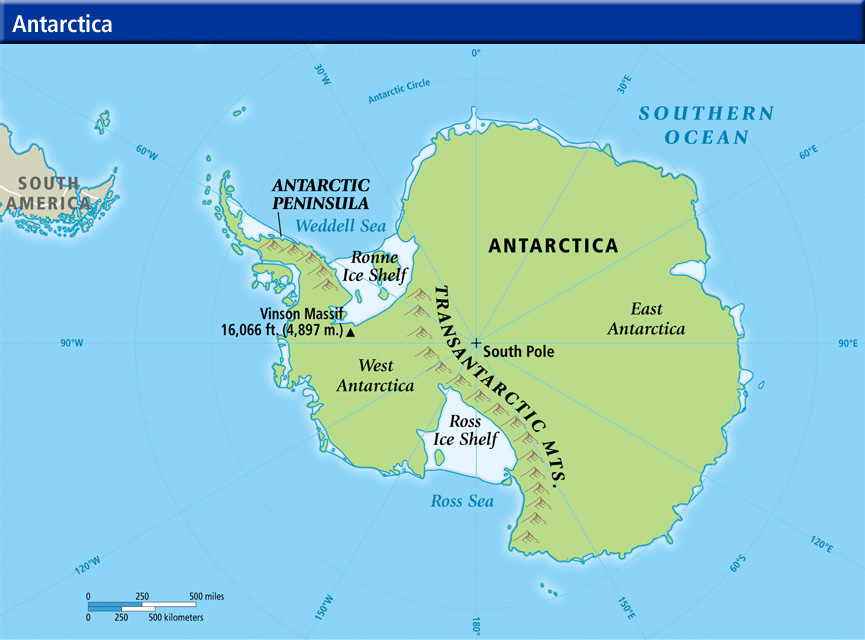
Geographical map of Antarctica

Lying on the Pacific Ocean side of the Transantarctic Mountains, West Antarctica comprises the Antarctic Peninsula (with Graham Land and Palmer Land) and Ellsworth Land, Marie Byrd Land and King Edward VII Land, offshore islands such as Adelaide Island, and ice shelves, notably the Filchner-Ronne Ice Shelf on the Weddell Sea, and the Ross Ice Shelf on the Ross Sea.

West Antarctica was named in the early 20th century. That usage became standard following the International Geophysical Year (1957–1958) and explorations which disclosed that the Transantarctic Mountains provide a useful regional border between West Antarctica and East Antarctica. The Advisory Committee on Antarctic Names approved the name in 1962.

West Antarctica is mostly covered by a massive ice sheet referred to as the West Antarctic Ice Sheet. In recent decades, this ice sheet has shown signs of decreasing mass.

The geologic history of West Antarctica was summarized in a 2020 publication.

== Marielandia Antarctic tundra ==
The parts of West Antarctica not covered with ice (Antarctic oasis), which are the coasts of the Antarctic Peninsula, constitute a biodiversity region known as Marielandia Antarctic tundra (after Marie Byrd Land). This area has the warmest climate in Antarctica and the moss and lichen-covered rocks are free of snow during the summer months, although the weather is still intensely cold and the growing season very short.

== See also ==
- Tectonic evolution of the Transantarctic Mountains
- West Antarctic Rift System
