= Horlick Mountains Traverse =

The Horlick Mountains Traverse, along with the Little America-Byrd Station Traverse and the Sentinel Mountains Traverse, was one of three Antarctic traverses performed by Dr. Charles Bentley and his team before and during the International Geophysical Year of 1957-1958. Bentley spent two consecutive years in Antarctica completing these traverses and collecting data on the continent's geology and climate.
