= Thiel Mountains =

Part of the Transantarctic range in Ellsworth Land

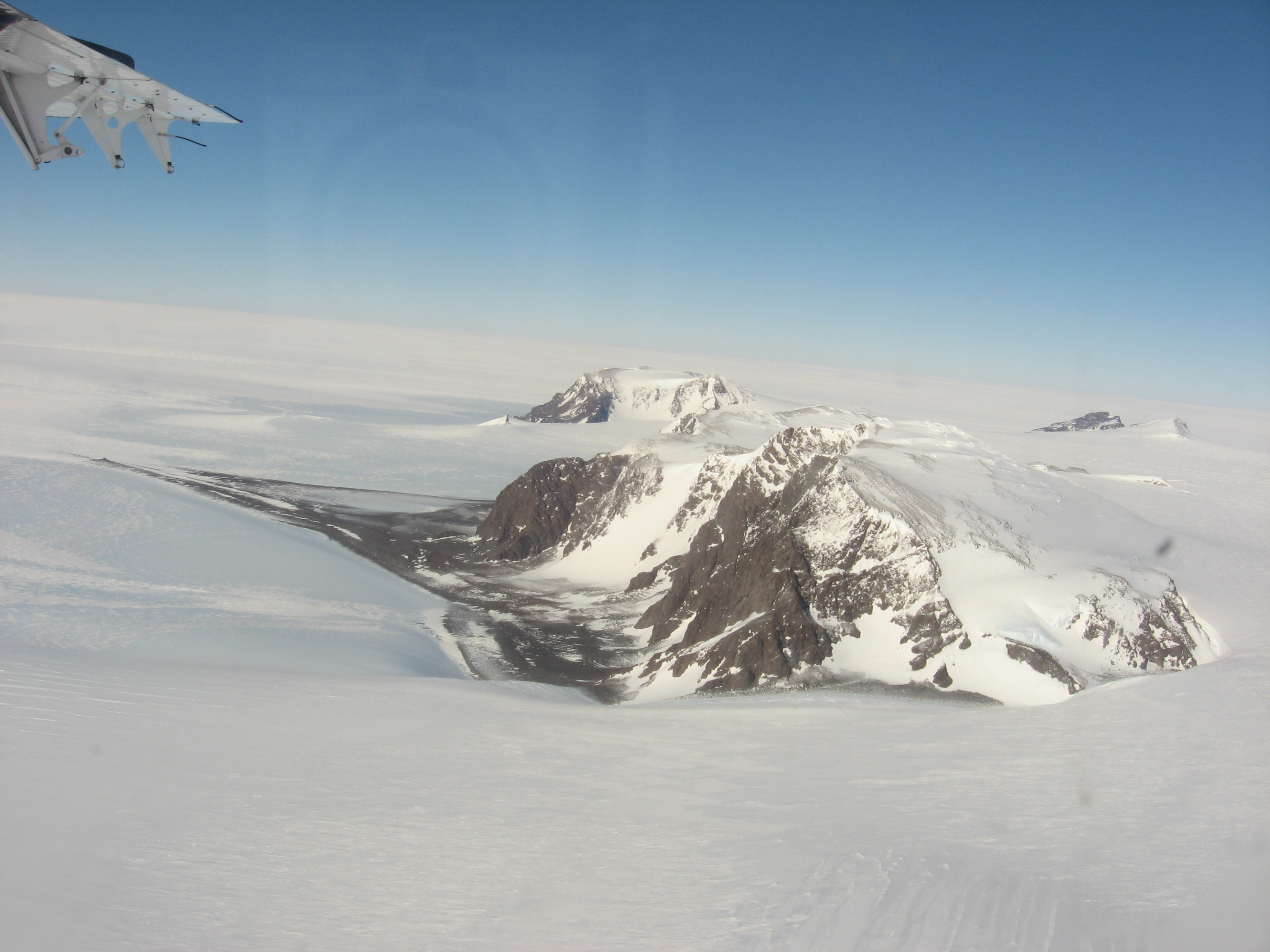
- Aerial view of the Thiel Mountains

Highest point
- Peak: Anderson Summit
- Elevation: 2,810 m (9,220 ft)
- Coordinates: 85°3′S 90°51′W

Dimensions
- Length: 72 km (45 mi)
- Area: 71,578 km^{2} (27,636 mi^{2})

Geography
- Location within Antarctica
- Continent: Antarctica
- Region: Ellsworth Land
- Parent range: Transantarctic Mountains

The Thiel Mountains (85°15′S 91°00′W) are isolated, mainly snow-capped mountains of the Transantarctic Mountains System, located in the Ellsworth Land region of Antarctica. The mountain range is 45 nautical miles (83 km; 52 mi) long, is located roughly between the Horlick Mountains and the Pensacola Mountains, and extends from Moulton Escarpment on the west to Nolan Pillar on the east. Major components include Ford Massif (2,810 metres (9,220 ft)), Bermel Escarpment and a group of eastern peaks near Nolan Pillar.

== Discovery and naming ==
The Thiel Mountains were observed and first positioned by the United States Antarctic Research Program (USARP) Horlick Mountains Traverse Party, 1958–59. They were surveyed by the United States Geological Survey (USGS) Thiel Mountains parties of 1960–61 and 1961–62. They were named by Advisory Committee on Antarctic Names (US-ACAN) after Edward C. Thiel, traverse seismologist at Ellsworth Station and the Pensacola Mountains in 1957. In December 1959, he made airlifted geophysical observations along the 88th meridian West, including work near these mountains. Thiel perished with four others in the crash of a P2V Neptune aircraft soon after take-off from Wilkes Station on November 9, 1961.

== Location ==
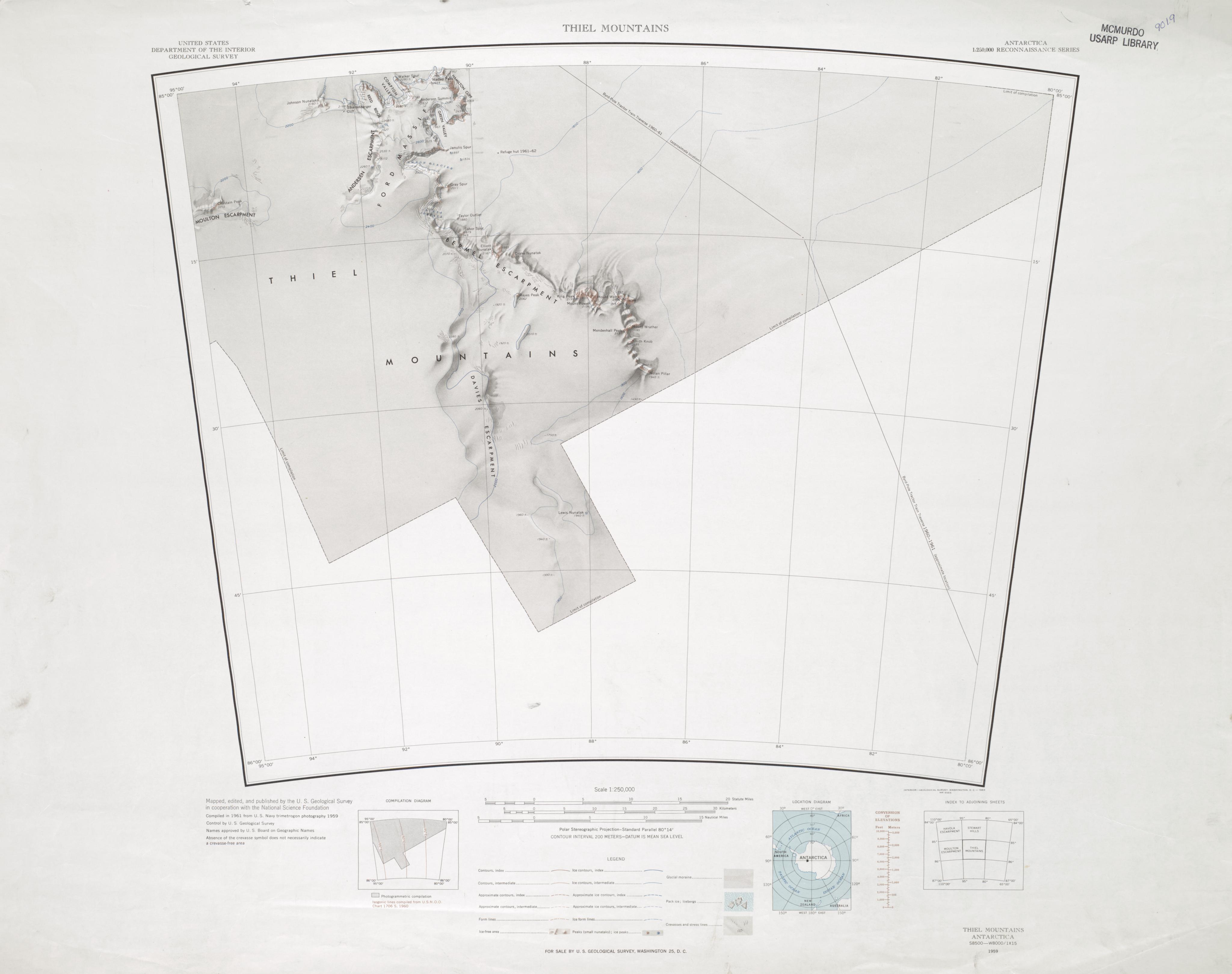
Thiel Mountains

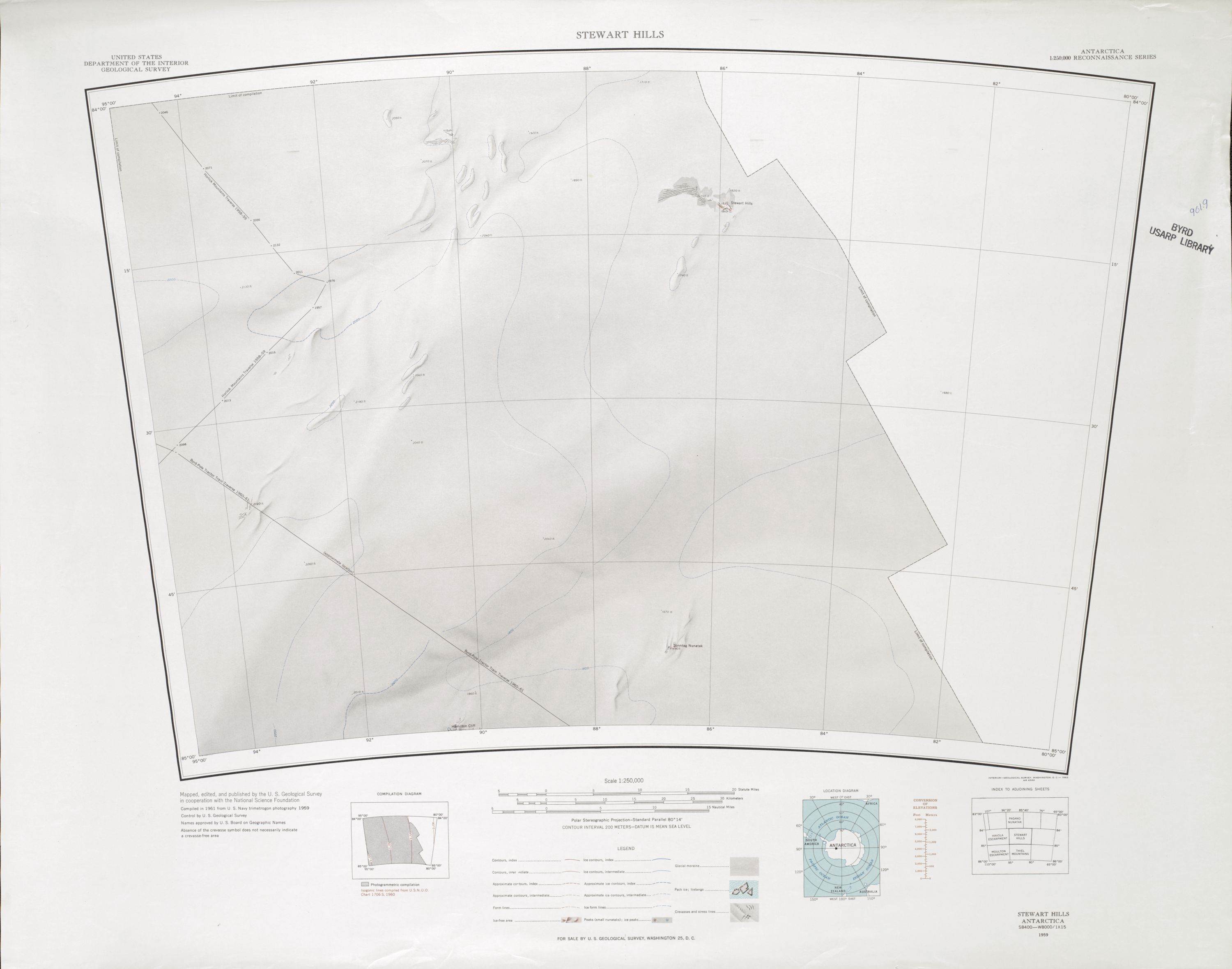
Region to the north of Thiel Mountains

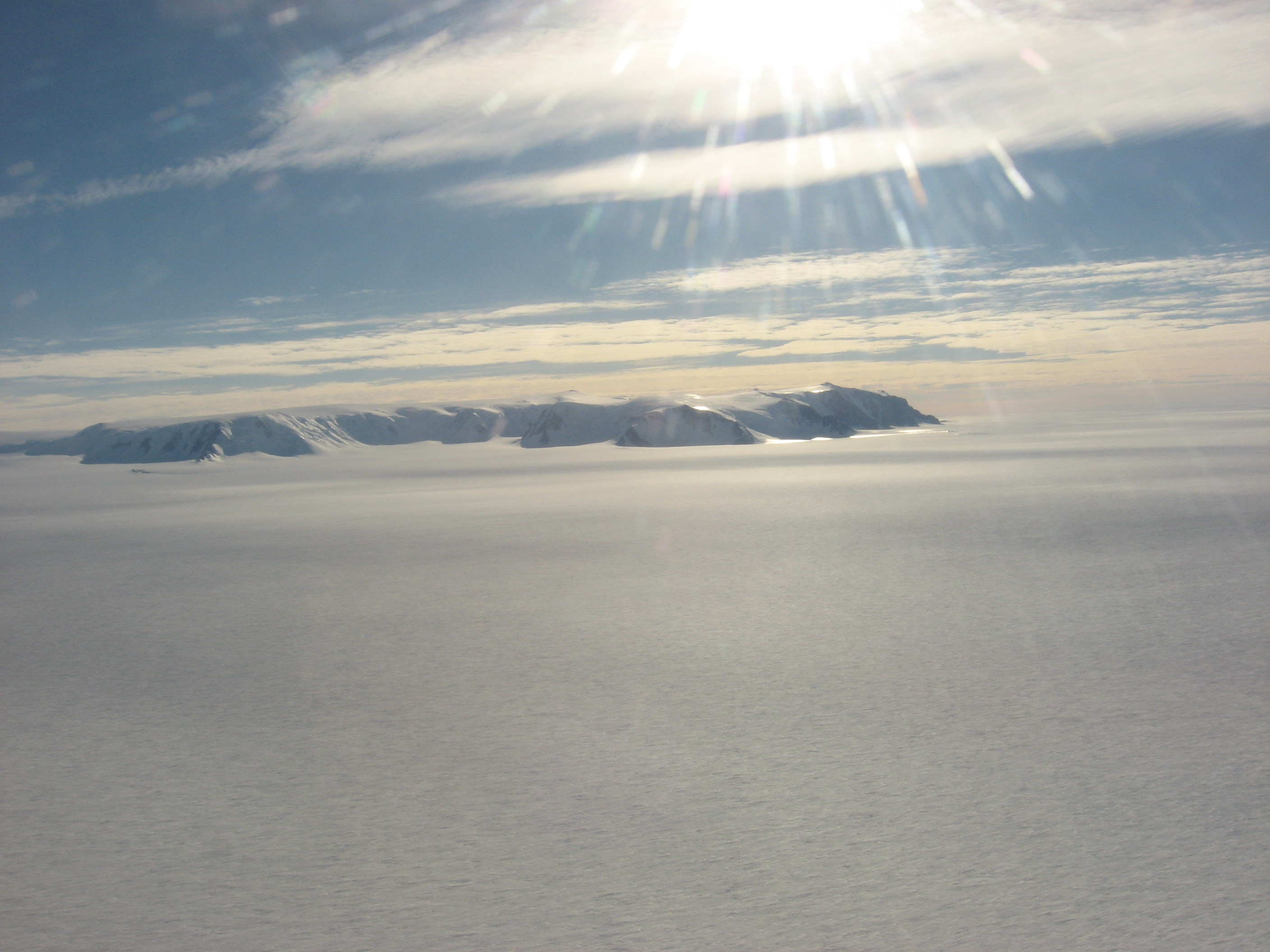
Distant aerial view of the Thiel Mountains

The Thiel Mountains include the Moulton Escarpment to the northwest, which includes Chastain Peak. To the north it contains the Ford Massif. To the southeast is the Bermel Escarpment, the Davies Escarpment and Lewis Nunatak. The Sontag Nunatak is some distance to the north, and the Stewart Hills are yet further north.

== Thiel aircraft refueling depot ==
Thiel Skiway
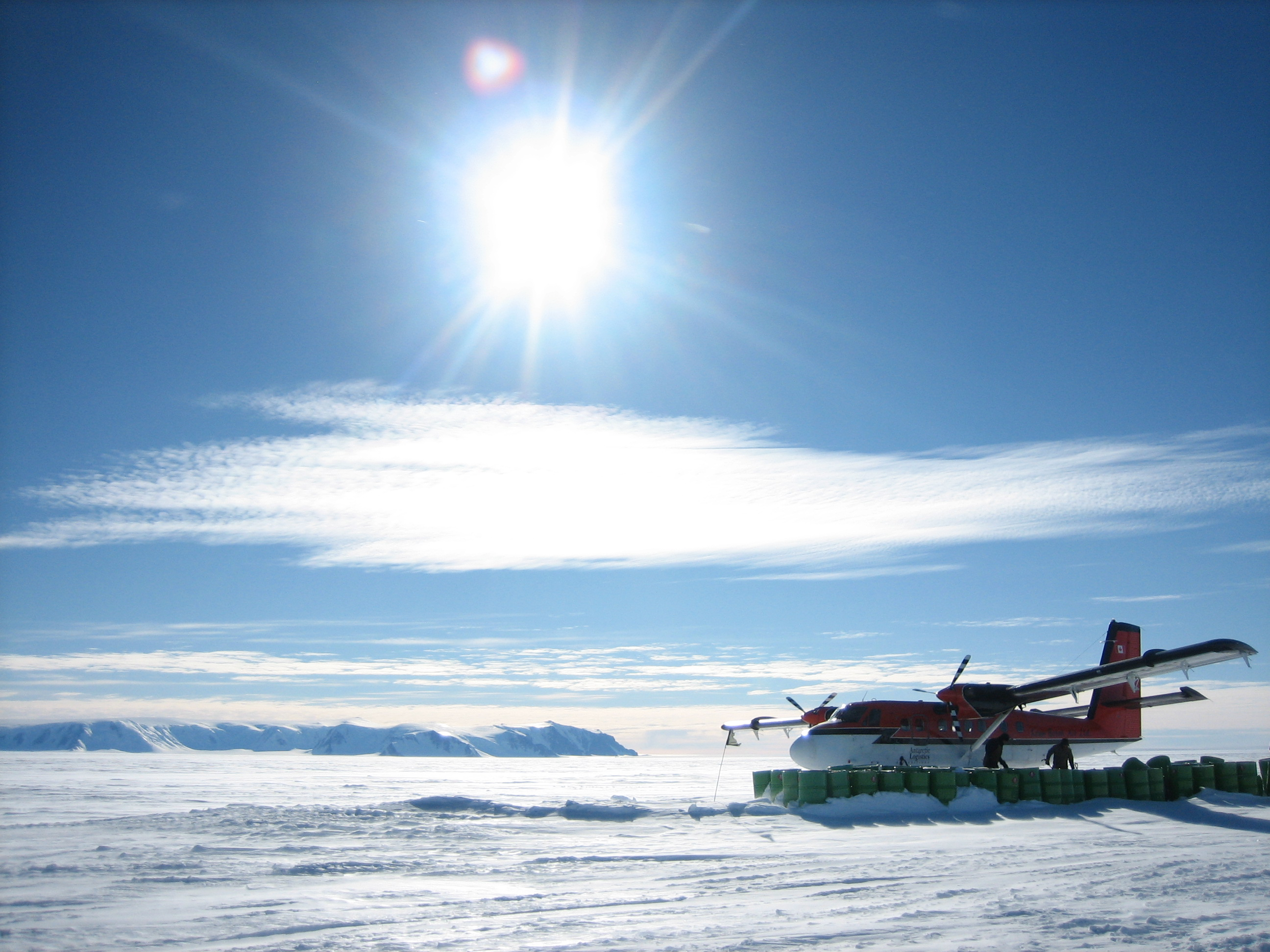
- Thiel Mountains refueling depot
- IATA: none; ICAO: AT26

Summary
- Airport type: Private
- Location: Thiel Mountains; Ellsworth Land
- Coordinates: 85°11′56″S 87°52′18″W
- Interactive map of Thiel Skiway

Runways
Direction	Length		Surface
Direction	ft	m	Surface
17/35	5,175	1,577	Ice

As of 2009, Adventure Network International/Antarctic Logistics & Expeditions (ANI/ALE) was the only member of the International Association of Antarctica Tour Operators (IAATO) that provided land-based tourism activities of any extent in the Antarctic. It was formed by a 2003 takeover of Adventure Network International by Antarctic Logistics & Expeditions. ALE/ANI maintains a fuel cache at Thiel Mountains, which provides fuel for long-distance flights and serves as a backup for Search and Rescue.

A 2002 description of the fuel depot near the Thiel Mountains said "the landing strip is a flat area within view of the mountains, marked with black garbage bags filled with snow. There are a bunch of 55-gallon drums of fuel and a Canadian flag." Visitors in December 2011 travelling in a Twin Otter from Union Glacier to the South Pole landed close to Thiel Mountains at 85°12′S 087°52′W to refuel on the way. The operator used to fly in fuel barrels, burning one barrel for every four delivered, but now carried the fuel barrels overland, a much more efficient approach.

== Features ==
In addition to the Ford Massif and Bermel Escarpment, there are various smaller features in or near the Thiel Mountains.

=== Moulton Escarpment ===
85°10′S 94°45′W. A rock and ice escarpment, 8 nautical miles (15 km; 9.2 mi) long, in a semi-isolated position about 10 nautical miles (19 km; 12 mi) west of Ford Massif where it forms the western shoulder of the Thiel Mountains. Surveyed by the USGS Thiel Mountains party, 1960–61. Named by US-ACAN for Kendall N. Moulton of the Division of Polar Programs, National Science Foundation. As program manager of the Foundation's Field Operation Program, Moulton made more than a dozen deployments to Antarctica in the years 1958–77.

=== Chastain Peak ===
85°10′S 94°35′W. A peak, 2,255 metres (7,398 ft), near the center of Moulton Escarpment, at the W margin of the Thiel Mountains. Surveyed by the USGS Thiel Mountains party, 1960–61. Named by US-ACAN after William W. Chastain, Aviation Structural Mechanic, United States Navy, who lost his life in the crash of a P2V Neptune aircraft soon after takeoff from Wilkes Station, Nov. 9, 1961.

=== Davies Escarpment ===
85°32′S 89°48′W. An east-facing ice escarpment over 10 nautical miles (19 km; 12 mi) long, located southward of Bermel Escarpment in the southern part of the Thiel Mountains. The feature appears to be devoid of rock outcroppings. The name was proposed by Peter Bermel and Arthur Ford, co-leaders of the USGS Thiel Mountains party of 1960–61. Named after William E. Davies, USGS geologist aboard the icebreaker Atka in the Antarctic reconnaissance cruise of 1954–55 in search of station sites for use during the International Geophysical Year.

=== Lewis Nunatak ===
85°40′S 88°05′W. An isolated, mainly snow-covered nunatak located about 10 nautical miles (19 km; 12 mi) southeast of the Davies Escarpment and 14 nautical miles (26 km; 16 mi) southwest of Nolan Pillar, at the south end of the Thiel Mountains. The name was proposed by Peter Bermel and Arthur Ford, co-leaders of the USGS Thiel Mountains party which surveyed the area in 1960–61. Named for Charles R. Lewis, USGS geologist who worked from various U.S. vessels (Wyandot, Glacier and Eastwind) in conducting research in the McMurdo Sound region and in the Balaena Islands during the 1955–56 season.

=== Sonntag Nunatak ===
84°53′S 86°42′W. A solitary nunatak located 20 nautical miles (37 km; 23 mi) east-northeast of Hamilton Cliff, Ford Massif. The nunatak was observed on Dec. 13, 1959 by Edward Thiel and Campbell Craddock in the course of a USARP airlifted geophysical traverse along the 88th meridian West. The name was proposed by Thiel and Craddock for Wayne Sonntag, Operations Director at the Geophysical Institute, University of Wisconsin, 1959–61, logistics officer for the airlifted traverse.

=== Stewart Hills ===
84°12′S 86°00′W. Several small nunataks and snow hills rising above an otherwise featureless terrain, 50 nautical miles (93 km; 58 mi) northeast of Ford Massif. Observed by the USARP Horlick Mountains Traverse, 1958–59, and by Edward Thiel and Campbell Craddock in the course of an airlifted geophysical traverse, Dec. 13, 1959. The name was proposed by Thiel and Craddock for Prof. Duncan Stewart, geologist, Carleton College, Minnesota, whose writing and interpretation of Antarctic rock samples have contributed to knowledge of the continent.

=== Hart Hills ===
83°43′S 89°05′W. A line of low, mainly snow-covered hills, 4 nautical miles (7.4 km; 4.6 mi) long, trending east–west. The hills are isolated, lying 8 nautical miles (15 km; 9.2 mi) west of Pagano Nunatak and 77 nautical miles (143 km; 89 mi) north of the Ford Massif of the Thiel Mountains. Observed by Edward Thiel and Campbell Craddock in the course of an airlifted geophysical traverse along the 88th meridian West, December 13, 1959. The name was proposed by them for Pembroke Hart, National Academy of Sciences staff, member of the technical panel on seismology and gravity on the U.S. National Committee for the IGY.

=== Pagano Nunatak ===
83°41′S 87°40′W. A notable rock nunatak with a pointed summit, 1,830 metres (6,000 ft) high, which stands in relative isolation, 8 nautical miles (15 km; 9.2 mi) east of Hart Hills and 80 nautical miles (150 km; 92 mi) north-northeast of the Ford Massif. The nunatak was examined and sketched by Edward Thiel in the course of an airlifted seismic traverse along meridian 88°W in the 1959–60 season. Named by US-ACAN after Chief Warrant Officer Gerald Pagano (d.1981), USA, assistant for plans and operations on the staff of the Commander, U.S. Naval Support Force, Antarctica, 1960–65; staff member, Center for Polar Archives, National Archives, 1972–81.

== Sources ==
- Alberts, Fred G., ed. (1995), Geographic Names of the Antarctic (PDF) (2 ed.), United States Board on Geographic Names This article incorporates public domain material from websites or documents of the United States Board on Geographic Names.
- Kern, Don (2002), "To the Pole", Antarctica Marathon Journal
- Land-Based Tourism Facilities, IAATO, 2009
- Thiel Mountains, USGS: United States Geological Survey
- Schindler, Florian (13 December 2011), 90°S (visit #4), confluence.org
- Stewart Hills, USGS: United States Geological Survey

This article incorporates public domain material from websites or documents of the United States Geological Survey.
