= Pastor Peak =

Mountain peak in Marie Byrd Land, Antarctica

Pastor Peak (85°54′S 134°42′W) is a peak rising to 2,000 m along the north wall of Colorado Glacier, located midway between Teller Peak and Eblen Hills on the ridge descending from Michigan Plateau. Mapped by United States Geological Survey (USGS) from surveys and U.S. Navy air photos, 1960–64. Named by Advisory Committee on Antarctic Names (US-ACAN) for Stephan E. Pastor, equipment operator, a member of the winter parties at the Naval Air Facility, McMurdo Sound, 1956, Byrd Station in 1960 and McMurdo Station in 1964.
