= Metavolcanic Mountain =

Mountain in Marie Byrd Land, Antarctica

- Location within Antarctica

Highest point
- Coordinates: 86°13′S 126°15′W

Geography
- Continent: Antarctica
- Area: Marie Byrd Land

Metavolcanic Mountain (86°13′S 126°15′W) is a large flat-topped mountain, 2,480 metres (8,140 ft) high, located 5 nautical miles (9.3 km; 5.8 mi) north of the Hatcher Bluffs on the east side of Reedy Glacier, Antarctica.

== Discovery and naming ==
Metavolcanic Mountain was mapped by the United States Geological Survey (USGS) from surveys and United States Navy aerial photographs, 1960–64. A geologist, John H. Mercer of the Institute of Polar Studies, Ohio State University, proposed the name after field work in the vicinity.

== Location ==
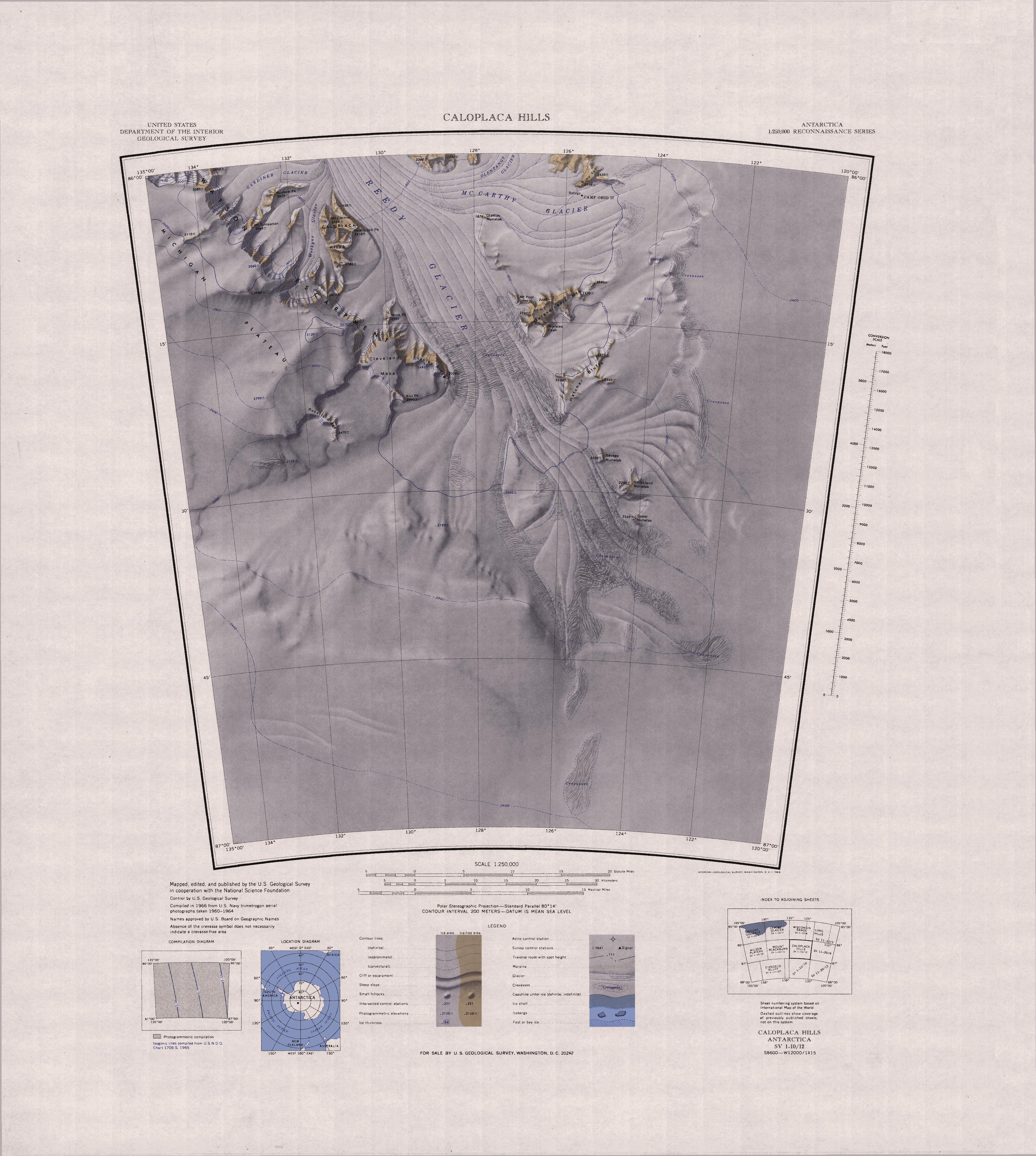
Metavolcanic Mountain in center north of map

Metavolcanic Mountain extends in an east-northeast direction from the east side of Reedy Glacier, opposite the Cleveland Mesa to the west. It is north of Hatcher Bluffs and south of the McCarthy Glacier, which runs along the south edge of the Wisconsin Range. Morales Peak extends from the south of the mountain, and Mount Pool is just to the north. Composed largely of dark metavolcanic rock, the mountain contrasts with lighter-colored granites surrounding it.

== Bedrock geology ==
The bedrock comprising Metavolcanic Mountain consists largely of eponymous metavolcanic rocks. These metavolcanic rocks belong to the Wyatt Formation. They consist of fragmented grains of quartz and feldspar, and rounded grains of blue quartz (?). The blue quartz grains are highly strained and partially resorbed. A fine-grained, recrystallized matrix of quartz and feldspar, which contains varying amounts of biotite and muscovite, surrounds these grains. The fine-grained matrix locally exhibit a strong secondary foliation. The metavolcanic rocks of the Wyatt Formation of Metavolcanic Mountain lack any primary structures and neither their thickness nor their attitude are known.

Sr-Ar dating of rocks Wyatt Formation from Metavolcanic Mountain and elsewhere indicates that these rocks were erupted during the Middle Cambrian Epoch. Thus, the Wyatt Formation were erupted at the surface of the Earth or intruded at shallow depth during the active phase of the Ross Orogeny.

The bedrock underlying the northwest tip of Metavolcanic Mountain is mapped as Granite Harbor Intrusives. These granites contain several zones of tourmaline granite. Adjacent to its contact with Granite Harbor Intrusives, quartz veins are commonly exposed in some outcrops of the Wyatt Formation.

== Surficial geology ==
A blockfield (felsenmeer) covers surface of Metavolcanic Mountain. The blockfield consists of boulders of dark metavolcanic rocks and scattered glacial erratics of highly weathered, light colored granite. Typically, the density of erratics is very sparse, not more than one to a square kilometer. A concentration of granitic erratics associated with 1 m (3.3 ft) of light-colored silty till containing cobbles of granitic and sedimentary rock occurs on Metavolcanic Mountain at about 2,700 m (8,900 ft) above sea level and 600 m (2,000 ft) above the subjacent surface of the Reedy Glacier.

A sample of this light-colored silty till of the Sirus Group was found to contain abundant foraminifera, diatoms, radiolarians, sponge spicules, ostracodes, and palynomorphs. The foraminifera consist of a mixture of Late Cretaceous and Eocene taxa. The fossil diatoms consist of Late Eocene through late Oligocene and Pliocene taxa. The Pliocene diatom taxa includes Coscinodisais vulnificus, which ranges from 3.1 to 2.2 myr in age. these fossils provide age constraints for the timing of PreQuaternary glaciations of this part of Antarctica.

== Sources ==
- Alberts, Fred G., ed. (1995), Geographic Names of the Antarctic (PDF) (2 ed.), United States Board on Geographic Names This article incorporates public domain material from websites or documents of the United States Board on Geographic Names.
- Caloplaca Hills, USGS: United States Geological Survey

This article incorporates public domain material from websites or documents of the United States Geological Survey.
