= Mount Carmer =

Mountain in Marie Byrd Land, Antarctica

Mount Carmer (86°6′S 131°11′W) is a mountain on the east side of Wotkyns Glacier in Antarctica, standing 2 nautical miles (4 km) west-northwest of Heathcock Peak in the Caloplaca Hills. It was mapped by the United States Geological Survey from surveys and from U.S. Navy air photos, 1960–64, and named by the Advisory Committee on Antarctic Names for John L. Carmer, electronics technician at Byrd Station in 1962.
