= Quartz Hills =

Mountains in Antarctica

- Location within Antarctica

Geography
- Continent: Antarctica
- Area: Marie Byrd Land
- Range coordinates: 85°56′S 132°50′W

The Quartz Hills (85°56′S 132°50′W) is an arcuate cluster of largely ice-free hills and peaks found immediately south of Colorado Glacier along the west side of Reedy Glacier. They are part of the Transantarctic Mountains of Antarctica.

== Discovery and naming ==
The United States Geological Survey (USGS) mapped the Quartz Hills using ground surveys and U.S. Navy air photos between 1960 and 1964. John H. Mercer, United States Antarctic Research Program (USARP) geologist, proposed this name based upon the abundance of rose quartz that occurs in the superficial deposits of these hills.

== Location ==
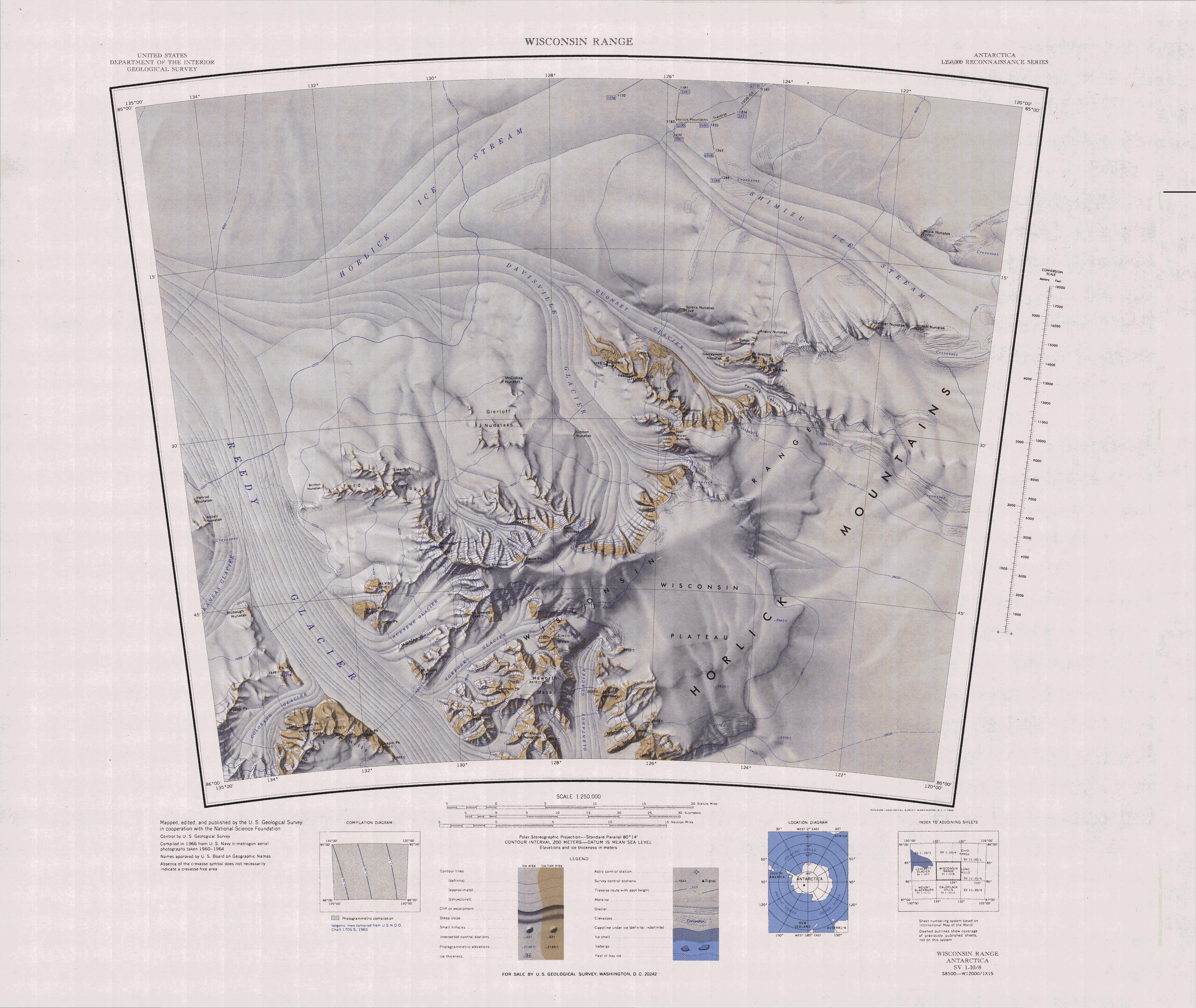
Quartz Hills in southwest of map

The Quartz Hills lie to the south of the junction between the Colorado Glacier, which flows from the southwest, and the Reedy Glacier, which flows from the southeast. Features include, from west to east, Dolan Peak, Hendrickson Peak, May Peak, Stich Peak and Chapin Peak. The Wisconsin Range, on the east side of the Reedy Glacier, covers about 8,600 square kilometres (3,300 sq mi) when it is taken to also include the Watson Escarpment south of the Kansas Glacier, the Quartz Hills, the Caloplaca Hills and the Cleveland Mesa, all in the Queen Maud Mountains to the west of the Reedy Glacier.

== Geomorphology ==
The Quartz Hills occupies an area about 20 km (12 mi) long and between 1 and 18 km (0.62 and 11.18 mi) wide that lies on the left side of the Reedy Glacier. Its landscape exhibits mature, steep, alpine relief, including horns, arêtes, cirques, and glacially carved valleys. They range from 1,180 m (3,870 ft), the surface elevation of Reedy Glacier, to about 2,200 m (7,200 ft) in elevation. In part, the Quartz Hills contains an extensive, low-angled slope, known as the Quartz Hills bench. It rises southward over a distance of about 4.5 km (2.8 mi) from about 1,300 m (4,300 ft) to more than 1,700 m (5,600 ft) in elevation. Within the Quartz Hills, ice cover is limited to perennial patches with the exception of one small, isolated glacier.

Well-preserved drift sheets and moraines form a veneer across the ice-free areas of the Quartz Hills. In 1968, Mercer identified three distinct drifts, the Reedy I, Reedy II, and Reedy III drifts, in order of decreasing age, based on position, composition, and relative weathering. Later, more detailed, mapping based upon drift position, composition, relative weathering, and cosmogenic surface exposure dating of glacial erratics recognized additional distinct glacial deposits designated as the Reedy A, B, C, D, and E drifts. The older of these drifts represent multiple periods of time during the mid to late Cenozoic when Reedy Glacier was significantly thicker than today. Thin patches of even older, highly weathered, undifferentiated drift lacking definite limits occur in the Quartz Hills. The Reedy III drift, was deposited when the ice surface near the head of the glacier was about 40 m (130 ft) higher than today and at the mouth of Reedy Glacier was about 500 m (1,600 ft) thicker during the Last Glacial Maximum. The deposition of Reedy B drift accumulated when Reedy Glacier was thicker and covered a larger aerial extent of the Quartz Hills during Marine Isotope Stage 6. The Reedy D drift represents the deposits of Reedy Glacier that accumulated when it covered even larger parts of the Quartz Hills more than 2.5 Myr ago. The oldest dated drift, Reedy E drift, represents the deposits of Reedy Glacier when it covered the Quartz Hills at least 5 Myr or more ago.

Finally, within the Reedy Glacier valley walls, outcrops of about 100 to 150 m (330 to 490 ft) of lithified diamictites and rhythmites (interbedded stratified mudstones and sandstones) occur unconformably overlying pre-Cenozoic bedrock. These diamictites and rhythmites, which are assigned to the Quartz Hills Formation of the Sirus Group, nonconformably overlie a glacially grooved and striated undulating surface eroded into granites and schistose rocks. The analysis of samples from the Quartz Hills Formation found it to be essentially barren of organic matter. The extremely rare palynomorphs recovered from it include: two specimens of an angiosperm pollen of unknown affinity and a specimen each of Podocarpidites and Chenopodiaceae pollen. The conifer specimen is similar to that recovered from other Sirius Group sediments. One sample from the Quartz Hills Formation yielded marine diatoms. These fossil diatoms included Pliocene-Pleistocene species Actinoqdus artinochilus, Tltalassiosira lenlittinosa, Tltalassiosira oestrupii and Tltalassiosira lorokina. Other samples only yielded freshwater diatoms, including well-preserved Stephanodiscus sp. , which is a Neogene freshwater diatom.

== Bedrock geology ==
Within the Quartz Hills, the exposed bedrock consists predominantly of coarse-grained granite gneiss; smaller amounts of orthoclase-feldspar and plagioclase-feldspar granites; and dark, fine-grained metasedimentary rocks. The granite gneiss and granites are plutonic rocks of the Wisconsin Range Batholith. Within the Quartz Hills, the dark, fine-grained metasedimentary rocks consist of gray to black phyllites, metagraywackes, and impure quartzites of the LaGorce Formation. They and associated mafic metavolcanic rocks of the Wyatt Formation are both intruded by granitic rocks of the Wisconsin Range Batholith. Therefore, these granitic rocks are not the continental crust upon which the sedimentary and volcanic rocks of LaGorce and Wyatt formations were deposited prior to the Ross orogeny.

== Features ==
=== Dolan Peak ===
85°56′S 133°15′W. A rock peak, 2,070 metres (6,790 ft) high, standing 2 nautical miles (3.7 km; 2.3 mi) west-northwest of Hendrickson Peak in the northwest part of the Quartz Hills. Mapped by USGS from surveys and United States Navy air photos, 1960–64. Named by the United States Advisory Committee on Antarctic Names (US-ACAN) for Theodore G. Dolan, glaciologist at Byrd Station, summer 1959-60.

=== Hendrickson Peak ===
85°56′S 132°49′W. A rock peak rising over 2,000 metres (6,600 ft) high at the west side of Reedy Glacier, standing 2 nautical miles (3.7 km; 2.3 mi) west of May Peak in the Quartz Hills. Mapped by USGS from surveys and United States Navy air photos, 1960–64. Named by US-ACAN for George Hendrickson, glaciologist at Byrd Station, 1962–63 and 1963–64.

=== May Peak ===
85°57′S 132°23′W. A pyramidal peak rising over 2,200 metres (7,200 ft) high at the west side of Reedy Glacier, standing 1 nautical mile (1.9 km; 1.2 mi) west of Stich Peak in the Quartz Hills. Mapped by USGS from surveys and United States Navy air photos, 1960–64. Named by US-ACAN for Lieutenant Commander Robert L. May, United States Navy, helicopter pilot at McMurdo Station, 1962–63.

=== Stich Peak ===
85°57′S 132°01′W. A peak, 2,305 metres (7,562 ft) high, on the west side of Reedy Glacier, standing between May Peak and Chapin Peak in the Quartz Hills. Mapped by USGS from surveys and United States Navy air photos, 1960–64. Named by US-ACAN for Lieutenant Commander John D. Stich, United States Navy, pilot at McMurdo Station during 1962–63 and 1963–64.

=== Chapin Peak ===
85°58′S 131°40′W. A prominent rock peak 2,170 metres (7,120 ft) high on the west side of Reedy Glacier, standing 2 nautical miles (3.7 km; 2.3 mi) southeast of Stich Peak in the Quartz Hills. Mapped by USGS from surveys and United States Navy air photos, 1960–64. Named by US-ACAN for Captain Howard Chapin, USMC, pilot with United States Navy Squadron VX-6 at McMurdo Station, 1962–63 season.

== Sources ==
- Alberts, Fred G., ed. (1995), Geographic Names of the Antarctic (PDF) (2 ed.), United States Board on Geographic Names This article incorporates public domain material from websites or documents of the United States Board on Geographic Names.
- Bromley, G.R.; Hall, B.L.; Stone, J.O.; Conway, H.; Todd, C.E. (2010), "Late Cenozoic deposits at Reedy Glacier, Transantarctic mountains: implications for former thickness of the West Antarctic Ice Sheet.", Quaternary Science Reviews, 29 (3–4)
- Faure, Gunter; Mensing, Teresa M. (21 September 2010), The Transantarctic Mountains: Rocks, Ice, Meteorites and Waterpage, Springer Science & Business Media, ISBN 978-90-481-9390-5
- Mercer, J.H. (1968), "Glacial geology of the Reedy Glacier area, Antarctica", Geological Society of America Bulletin, 79 (4)
- Wilson, G.S.; Harwood, D.M.; Askin, R.A.; Levy, R.H. (1998), "Late Neogene Sirius Group strata in Reedy Valley, Antarctica: A multiple-resolution record of climate, ice-sheet and sea-level events.", Journal of Glaciology, 44 (148)
- Wisconsin Range, USGS: United States Geological Survey
