= Carmer =

Carmer is a surname. Notable people with the surname include:

- Adam Carmer (born 1966), American writer and inventor
- Carl Carmer (1893–1976), American writer
- Johann Heinrich von Carmer (1720–1801), Prussian judicial reformer
- Sherlock Houston Carmer (1842–1884), American politician

See also

- Carmer Octagon House, also known as the Armour–Stiner House, is a unique octagon-shaped and domed Victorian style house located at 45 West Clinton Avenue in Irvington, in Westchester County, New York
- Mount Carmer, is a mountain on the east side of Wotkyns Glacier (Antarctica)
