= Wisconsin Range =

Mountain range in Antarctica

- Location within Antarctica

Highest point
- Peak: 3,940 metres (12,930 ft), Faure Peak

Naming
- Etymology: University of Wisconsin–Madison, where numerous researchers were from

Geography
- Continent: Antarctica
- Area: Marie Byrd Land
- Range coordinates: 85°45′S 125°00′W
- Parent range: Horlick Mountains

The Wisconsin Range (85°45′S 125°00′W) is a major mountain range of the Horlick Mountains in Antarctica, comprising the Wisconsin Plateau and numerous glaciers, ridges and peaks bounded by the Reedy Glacier, Shimizu Ice Stream, Horlick Ice Stream and the interior ice plateau.

== Discovery and naming ==
The Wisconsin Range was mapped by the United States Geological Survey (USGS) from surveys and United States Navy air photos, 1959–64. It was named by the United States Advisory Committee on Antarctic Names (US-ACAN) for the University of Wisconsin–Madison, Madison, Wisconsin, which has sent numerous researchers to Antarctica.

The first air photographs of the Wisconsin Range were taken by United States Navy Taskforce 68 during Operation Highjump in 1946–47. In 1958 an oversnow tractor train drove from Byrd Station in West Antarctica to a temporary station on the Ross Ice Shelf. From there, William E. Long and F. Darling walked south to the Wisconsin Range escarpment and gathered samples of granitic rock from Mount LeSchack. In 1964–65 Gunter Faure and John H. Mercer led a group of geologists from what is now the Byrd Polar Research Center of Ohio State University to study the Wisconsin Range and the Long Hills, using snowmobiles and three United States Army helicopters to access all parts of the area. In 1990–91 a team using a Twin Otter airplane sampled basement rocks in the Wisconsin Range.

== Location ==
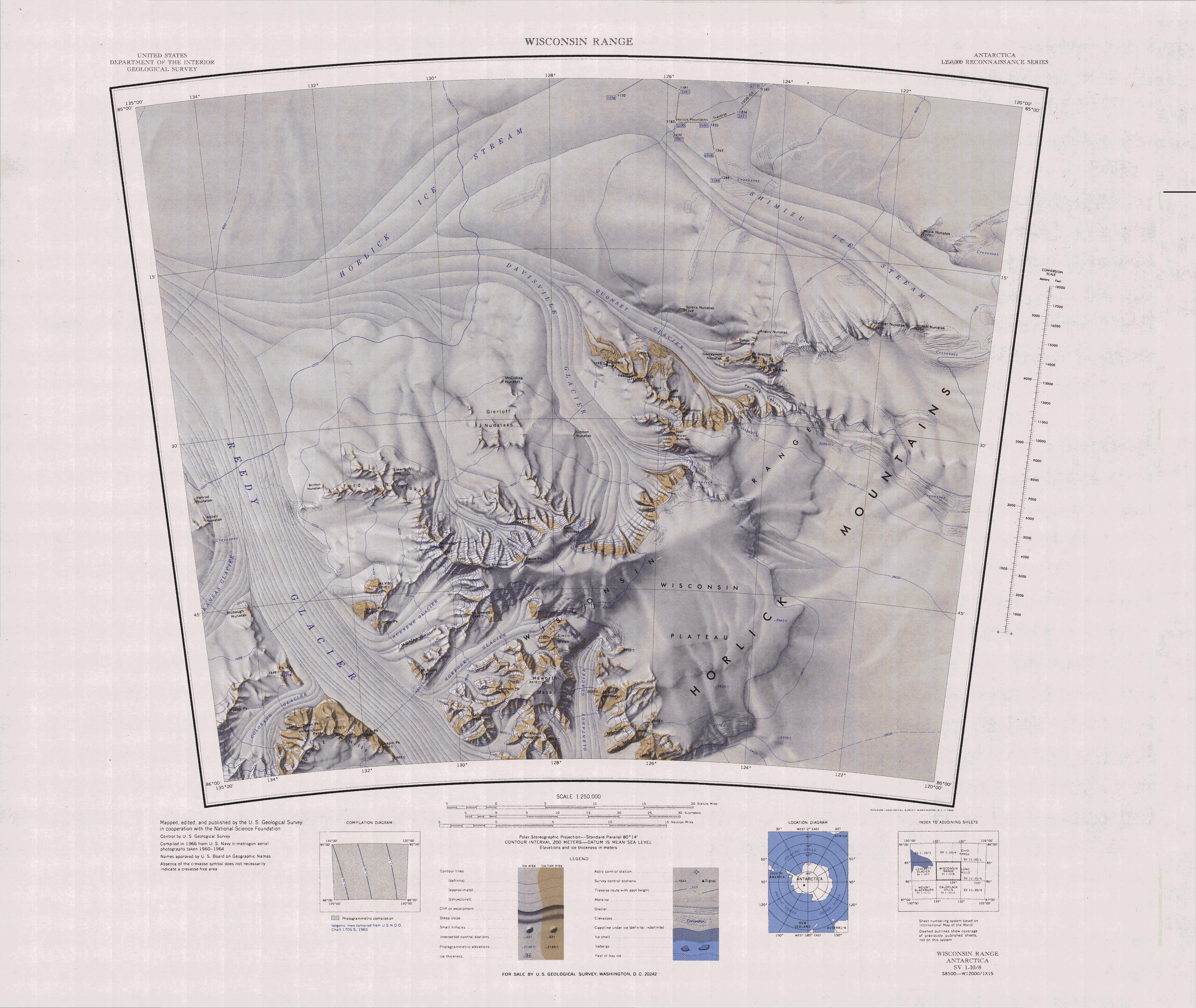
Wisconsin Range

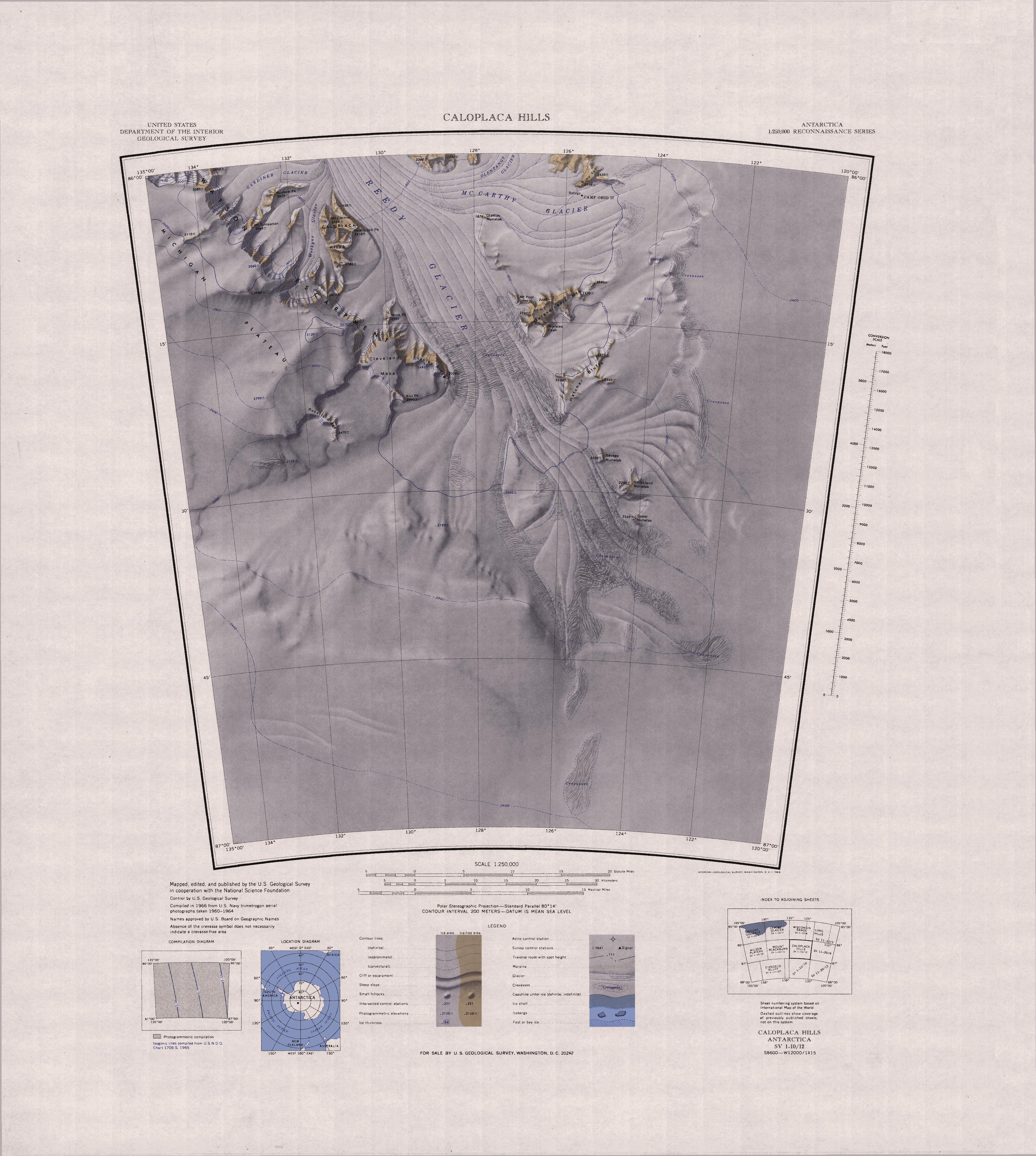
Southern tip of the range in north of map

The Wisconsin Range is east of the Reedy Glacier and south of the Horlick Ice Stream and the Shimizu Ice Stream. The Wisconsin Plateau is in the southeast of the range. The southeast of the range borders the west of the Wisconsin Plateau and overlooks the Olentangy Glacier. From south to north it includes Polygon Spur, Tillite Spur, Red Spur and Mount Huckaby. The southern massif lies between Olentangy Glacier and Norfolk Glacier both tributaries of the Reedy Glacier. It includes Mount McNaughton, Mount Bolton, Goodwin Peak, Haworth Mesa and Sisco Mesa. The Wisconsin Range covers about 8,600 square kilometres (3,300 sq mi) when it is taken to also include the Watson Escarpment south of the Kansas Glacier, the Quartz Hills, the Caloplaca Hills and the Cleveland Mesa, all in the Queen Maud Mountains to the west of the Reedy Glacier.

The southwest part of the range includes Mount Soyat, Mickler Spur and Mount Sweatt between Norfolk Glacier and Hueneme Glacier, another tributary of Reedy Glacier. It includes Griffith Peak, Mount Frontz and Mount Vito to the north of Hueneme Glacier. The central portion of the range extends from west to east and includes Brinton Nunatak, the Ford Nunataks, Martens Peak, Murtaugh Peak, Mount Miashew, Faure Peak, Walters Peak and Lentz Buttress. The Gierloff Nunataks, McCrilliss Nunatak and Gibbon Nunatak are north of the central portion.

The north of the range is north of the Davisville Glacier, a tributary of the Horlick Ice Stream, and mostly south of the Quonset Glacier, a tributary of the Davisville Glacier that rises in Perkins Canyon. From west to east in includes Saunders Rock, Feeley Peak, Sheets Peak, Moran Buttress, Koopman Peak and Ruseski Buttress. Isolated features to the north of Quonset Glacier include, from west to east, Spiers Nunatak, Garczynski Nunatak, Baker Nunatak, Mount Brecher, Angus Nunatak, Mount LeSchack, Spencer Nunatak and Widich Nunatak.

Portions of the Wisconsin Range are recorded in aerial photography obtained by United States Navy Operation Highjump, 1946–47. The Horlick Mountains, including the Wisconsin Range, were completely surveyed by United States Antarctic Research Program (USARP) parties, and was mapped from United States Navy aerial photographs, 1959–64.

== List of mountains ==
This range includes the following mountains and peaks:

| Mountain/Peak | Metres | Feet | Coordinates |
|---|---|---|---|
| Faure Peak | 3,940 | 12,930 | 85°42′S 128°35′W |
| Mount Minshew | 3,895 | 12,779 | 85°43′S 129°22′W |
| Mount LeSchack | 2,265 | 7,431 | 85°25′S 124°00′W |
| Koopman Peak | 2,200 | 7,200 | 85°29′S 125°35′W |
| Mount Soyat | 2,150 | 7,050 | 85°52′S 130°46′W |
| Sheets Peak | 1,800 | 5,900 | 85°28′S 125°52′W |

== Southeast features ==
=== Wisconsin Plateau ===
85°48′S 125°24′W. A large ice-capped plateau with general elevations above 2,800 metres (9,200 ft) high, comprising most of the upland surface area of the Wisconsin Range, Horlick Mountains. To the east and southeast, the plateau descends gradually and with only minor ice escarpments to merge with the interior ice plateau. To the north and west, the plateau displays abrupt escarpments and cliffs of over 1,000 metres (3,300 ft). Named by the United States Advisory Committee on Antarctic Names (US-ACAN) in association with the Wisconsin Range.

=== Mims Spur ===
86°02′S 125°35′W. A prominent rock spur protruding from the south extremity of Wisconsin Plateau, situated just southeast of Polygon Spur on the north side of McCarthy Glacier. Named by US-ACAN for Julius E. Mims, Jr., radioman at Byrd Station in 1962.

=== Polygon Spur ===
86°00′S 126°00′W. A broad, ice-free spur lying 2 nautical miles (3.7 km; 2.3 mi) southeast of Tillite Spur at the south end of the Wisconsin Plateau. The name was proposed by John H. Mercer, USARP geologist to these mountains, 1964-65, because the surface of the spur is covered by a network of unsorted polygons.

=== Tillite Spur ===
85°59′S 126°36′W. A narrow, steep-cliffed rock spur, 3 nautical miles (5.6 km; 3.5 mi) long,.descending from southern Wisconsin Plateau between Red Spur and Polygon Spur and terminating at the east side of Olentangy Glacier. The name was proposed by John H. Mercer, USARP geologist to this area in 1964-65, because tillite extends the length of the spur above its granitic cliffs.

=== Red Spur ===
85°57′S 126°44′W. A narrow rock spur, 2 nautical miles (3.7 km; 2.3 mi) long, descending from southern Wisconsin Plateau to Olentangy Glacier 1 nautical mile (1.9 km; 1.2 mi) north of Tillite Spur. The name was proposed by John H. Mercer, USARP geologist to this area in 1964-65, because the surface of a flat platform on this spur is weathered bright red.

=== Mount Huckaby ===
85°54′S 127°03′W. An ice-free, wedge-shaped mountain in the western Wisconsin Range, 2,620 metres (8,600 ft) high, surmounting the east wall of Olentangy Glacier just east of Haworth Mesa. Named by US-ACAN for Commander Donnie W. Huckaby, maintenance officer at McMurdo Station for United States Navy Squadron VX-6 during 1962-63 and 1963-64.

== Southern features ==
=== Mount McNaughton ===
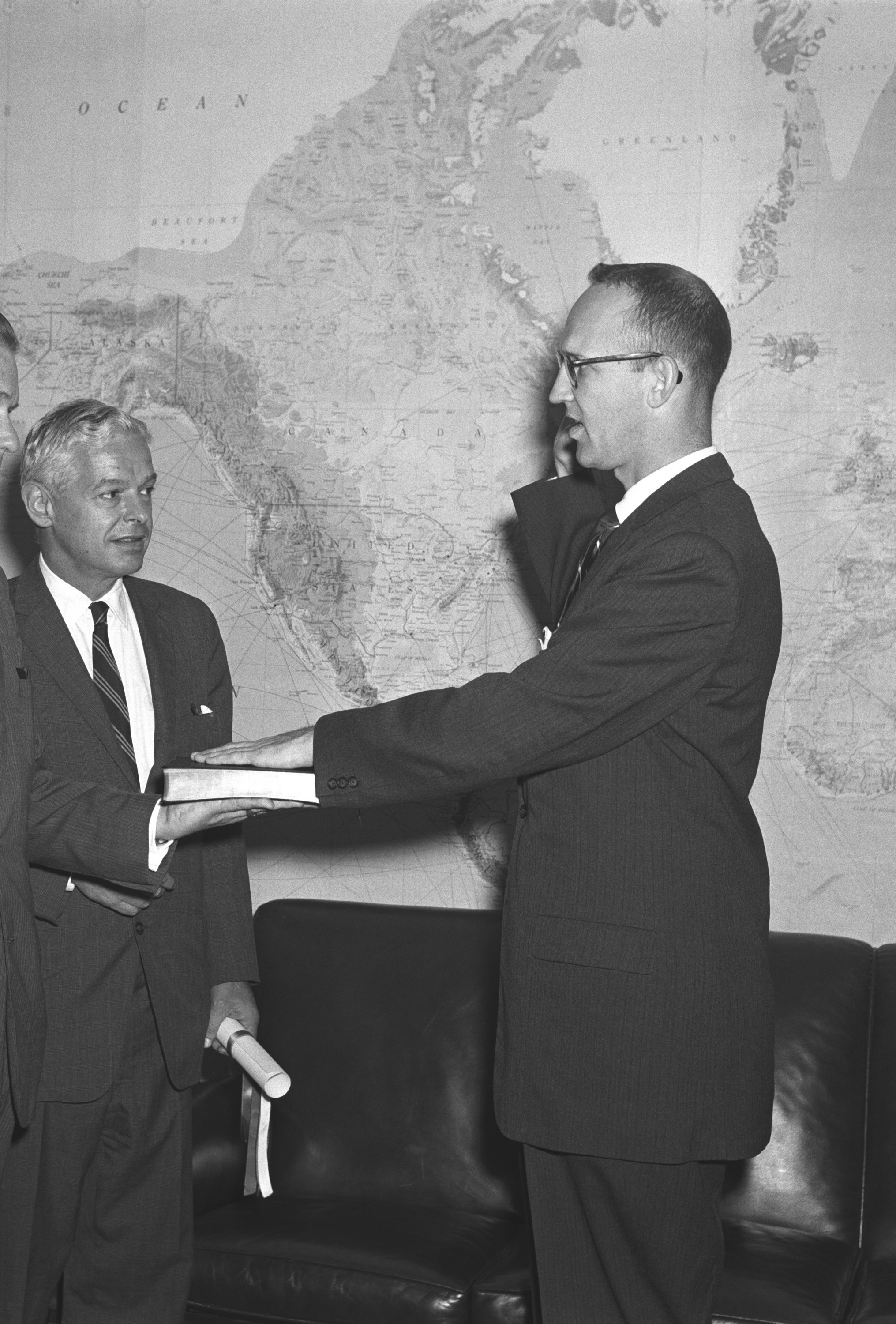
John T. McNaughton taking oath of office in 1963

85°58′S 128°12′W. A large mountain rising over 3,000 metres (9,800 ft) high, standing 2 nautical miles (3.7 km; 2.3 mi) south of Haworth Mesa in the western Wisconsin Range. Named by US-ACAN for John T. McNaughton, Assistant Secretary of Defense for International Security Affairs, a member of the Antarctic Policy Group from 1965 until his death in 1967.

=== Mount Bolton ===
85°56′S 129°43′W. A prominent mountain in western Wisconsin Range, 2,840 metres (9,320 ft) high, standing 6 nautical miles (11 km; 6.9 mi) southeast of Mount Soyat along the east side of Reedy Glacier. Named by US-ACAN for Lieutenant James L. Bolton, United States Navy, helicopter pilot on United States Navy Operation Deep Freeze 1965, 1966 and 1967.

=== Goodwin Peak ===
85°54′S 129°11′W. A peak, 2,770 metres (9,090 ft) high, standing 3 nautical miles (5.6 km; 3.5 mi) northeast of Mount Bolton, at the west side of Haworth Mesa, in the Wisconsin Range. Named by US-ACAN after Commander Edmund E. Goodwin, Public Affairs Officer on the staff of the Commander, United States Naval Support Force, Antarctica, during Operation Deep Freeze 1965 and 1966.

=== Haworth Mesa ===
85°54′S 128°18′W. An ice-capped mesa with steep rock walls whose summit area is 5 nautical miles (9.3 km; 5.8 mi) long and 3 nautical miles (5.6 km; 3.5 mi) wide and rises to 3,610 metres (11,840 ft) high, standing between Sisco Mesa and Mount McNaughton where it forms part of the divide between Norfolk and Olentangy Glaciers in western Wisconsin Range. Named by US-ACAN for Leland John Haworth, Director of the National Science Foundation and a member of the Antarctic Policy Group.

=== Sisco Mesa ===
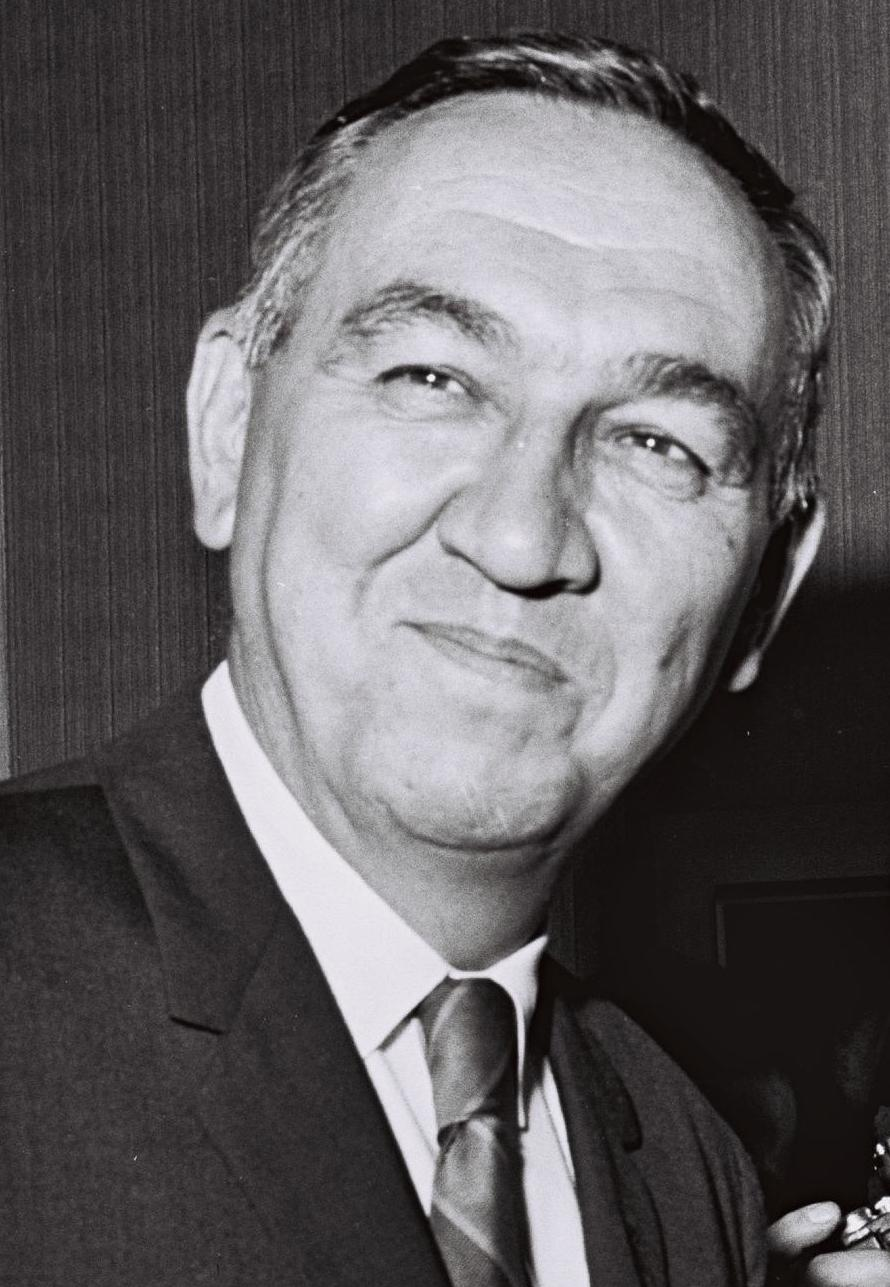
[Joseph J. Sisco 1970

85°50′S 127°48′W. An ice-capped mesa with steep rock walls whose summit area is 2 nautical miles (3.7 km; 2.3 mi) long and wide and rises to 3,350 metres (10,990 ft). It stands just north of Haworth Mesa between the heads of Norfolk and Olentangy Glaciers in the Wisconsin Range. Named by US-ACAN for Joseph J. Sisco, Assistant Secretary of State for International Organization Affairs, Chairman of the Antarctic Policy Group in 1966.

== Southwest features ==
=== Mount Soyat ===
85°52′S 130°46′W. A prominent mountain, 2,150 metres (7,050 ft) high, in western Wisconsin Range, rising on the east side of Reedy Glacier just north of the junction of Norfolk Glacier. Named by US-ACAN for Commander David Soyat, United States Navy, air operations officer with Squadron VX-6 at McMurdo Station, winter 1962.

=== Mickler Spur ===
85°49′S 130°45′W. A narrow spur, 4 nautical miles (7.4 km; 4.6 mi) long, forming the south wall of Hueneme Glacier in western Wisconsin Range and terminating at Reedy Glacier. Named by US-ACAN for Raymond R. Mickler, equipment operator, a member of the winter parties at Byrd Station in 1961 and McMurdo Station in 1964.

=== Mount Sweatt ===
85°47′S 129°39′W. A mountain, 2,540 metres (8,330 ft) high, standing 6.5 nautical miles (12.0 km; 7.5 mi) northeast of Mount Soyat on the ridge between Hueneme and Norfolk Glaciers, in the Wisconsin Range. Named by US-ACAN for Earl E. Sweatt, construction electrician, Byrd Station winter party, 1961.

=== Griffith Peak ===
85°47′S 131°31′W. A rock peak rising over 1,800 metres (5,900 ft) high in western Wisconsin Range, standing at the north side of the mouth of Hueneme Glacier at the junction with Reedy Glacier. Named by US-ACAN for Raymond E. Griffith, cook with the winter parties at Byrd Station in 1961 and 1963.

=== Mount Frontz ===
85°46′S 131°46′W. A prominent mountain in western Wisconsin Range, 2,010 metres (6,590 ft) high, rising between Mount Vito and Griffith Peak on the east side of Reedy Glacier. Named by US-ACAN for Lieutenant Commander Leroy Frontz, aircraft commander during United States Navy OpDFrz 1966 and 1967.

=== Mount Vito ===
85°44′S 131°30′W. A bare mountain, 1,810 metres (5,940 ft) high, in western Wisconsin Range, standing 2 nautical miles (3.7 km; 2.3 mi) northeast of Mount Frontz along the east side of Reedy Glacier. Named by US-ACAN for John Vito, electronics technician, Byrd Station winter party, 1961.

== Central features ==
=== Brinton Nunatak ===
85°35′S 132°24′W. A small nunatak marking the west extremity of Ford Nunataks, in the Wisconsin Range. Named by US-ACAN for Curtis C. Brinton, utilitiesman with the Byrd Station winter party, 1957.

=== Ford Nunataks ===
85°35′S 131°30′W. A cluster of nunataks and low peaks rising above a network of ice-drowned ridges about 9 nautical miles (17 km; 10 mi) in extent, lying 7 nautical miles (13 km; 8.1 mi) northwest of Murtaugh Peak. Named by US-ACAN for Franklin E. Ford, construction mechanic with the winter parties at Byrd Station in 1961 and South Pole Station in 1965.

=== Martens Peak ===
85°34′S 131°02′W. A rock peak in the northeast part of Ford Nunataks. Named by US-ACAN for Edward A. Martens, radioman with the winter party at Byrd Station in 1960 and McMurdo Station in 1965.

=== Murtaugh Peak ===
85°41′S 130°15′W. A sharp peak, 3,085 metres (10,121 ft) high, surmounting a ridge 4 nautical miles (7.4 km; 4.6 mi) west-northwest of Mount Minshew in the Wisconsin Range. Named by US-ACAN for John E. Murtaugh, geologist with the Ohio State University geological party to the Horlick Mountains, 1964-65.

=== Mount Minshew ===
85°43′S 129°22′W. A prominent, mainly ice-covered mountain with a small exposed summit peak, 3,895 metres (12,779 ft) high, standing 3.5 nautical miles (6.5 km; 4.0 mi) west of Faure Peak at the northwest extremity of the elevated plateau portion of the Wisconsin Range. Named by US-ACAN for Velon H. Minshew, geologist with the Ohio State University geologic party to the Horlick Mountains, 1964-65.

=== Faure Peak ===
85°42′S 128°35′W. A peak, 3,940 metres (12,930 ft) high, standing 3.5 nautical miles (6.5 km; 4.0 mi) east of Mount Minshew along the north side of Wisconsin Plateau in the Horlick Mountains. Named by US-ACAN for Gunter Faure, leader of the Ohio State University geological party to the Horlick Mountains, 1964-65.

=== Walters Peak ===
85°39′S 128°45′W. A sharp peak, 2,430 metres (7,970 ft) high, on the spur descending the north slope of Wisconsin Range between Faure Peak and Lentz Buttress. Named by US-ACAN for Lieutenant Commander Robert E. Walters, United States Navy, a member of the McMurdo Station winter party, 1960.

=== Lentz Buttress ===
85°40′S 127°36′W. A prominent rock bluff 5 nautical miles (9.3 km; 5.8 mi) ENE of Faure Peak, rising to 2,800 metres (9,200 ft) high and forming a projection along the north side of the Wisconsin Plateau of the Horlick Mountains. Named by US-ACAN for Lieutenant Malcolm W. Lentz, United States Navy, officer in charge of the South Pole Station winter party, 1962.

=== Gierloff Nunataks ===
85°31′S 129°00′W. A group of nunataks lying 8 nautical miles (15 km; 9.2 mi) northwest of Lentz Buttress, at the north side of Wisconsin Range, Horlick Mountains. Named by US-ACAN after George B. Gierloff, builder, Byrd Station winter party, 1961.

=== McCrilliss Nunatak ===
85°27′S 128°55′W. A nunatak marking the north end of the Gierloff Nunataks on the north side of the Wisconsin Range. Named by US-ACAN for Harold L. McCrilliss, construction electrician, a member of the winter parties at Byrd Station in 1959 and South Pole Station in 1964.

=== Gibbon Nunatak ===
85°31′S 127°36′W. An isolated nunatak on the north side of Wisconsin Range, standing 8 nautical miles (15 km; 9.2 mi) north of Lentz Buttress on the west side of Davisville Glacier. Named by US-ACAN for Thomas L. Gibbon, construction driver Byrd Station winter party, 1959.

== Northern features ==
=== Saunders Rock ===
85°25′S 127°02′W. A rock 3 nautical miles (5.6 km; 3.5 mi) northwest of Feeley Peak, between Davisville and Quonset Glaciers on the north side of Wisconsin Range. Named by US-ACAN for John T. Saunders, electronics technician, Byrd Station winter party, 1960.

=== Feeley Peak ===
85°26′S 126°26′W. A peak, 1,730 metres (5,680 ft) high, standing 3 nautical miles (5.6 km; 3.5 mi) northwest of Sheets Peak, between Davisville and Quonset Glaciers on the north side of Wisconsin Range. Named by US-ACAN for Keith E. Feeley, construction mechanic, Byrd Station winter party, 1959.

=== Sheets Peak ===
85°28′S 125°52′W. A peak over 1,800 metres (5,900 ft) high, standing 1 nautical mile (1.9 km; 1.2 mi) northwest of Koopman Peak on the north side of Wisconsin Range. Named by US-ACAN for Joseph D. Sheets, journalist on United States Navy OpDFrz 1965, 1966 and 1967.

=== Moran Buttress ===
85°31′S 125°38′W. A steep bluff 2 nautical miles (3.7 km; 2.3 mi) south of Koopman Peak, rising over 2,600 metres (8,500 ft) high and forming a major projection between Davisville and Quonset Glaciers along the north wall of the Wisconsin Range. Named by US-ACAN for Lieutenant Commander Clifford D. Moran, United States Navy, aircraft pilot during United States Navy Operation Deep Freeze 1966 and 1967.

=== Koopman Peak ===
85°29′S 125°35′W. A peak over 2,200 metres (7,200 ft) high, standing 2 nautical miles (3.7 km; 2.3 mi) north of Moran Buttress on the north side of Wisconsin Range. Named by US-ACAN for Kenneth E. Koopman, Navy yeoman on Operation Deep Freeze 1965, 1966 and 1967.

=== Ruseski Buttress ===
85°29′S 124°23′W. A projecting buttress rock or spur, forming the south portal to Perkins Canyon along the north side of the Wisconsin Range. Named by US-ACAN for Lieutenant Peter P. Ruseski (MC) United States Navy, of the Byrd Station winter party, 1958.

=== Perkins Canyon ===
85°27′S 124°20′W. A canyon at the head of Quonset Glacier, between Ruseski Buttress and Mount LeSchack, along the north side of Wisconsin Range. Named by US-ACAN for David M. Perkins, geomagnetist, Byrd Station winter party, 1961.

=== Spiers Nunatak ===
85°20′S 125°36′W. An isolated nunatak lying 8 nautical miles (15 km; 9.2 mi) west-northwest of Mount Brecher on the north side of Quonset Glacier, in the Wisconsin Range. Named by US-ACAN for Raymond R. Spiers, cook with the Byrd Station winter party, 1959.

=== Garczynski Nunatak ===
85°24′S 124°48′W. A cone-shaped nunatak, the highest in a cluster of nunataks close west of Mount Brecher, lying at the north flank of Quonset Glacier in the Wisconsin Range. Named by US-ACAN for Carl J. Garczynski, meteorologist, Byrd Station winter party, 1961.

=== Baker Nunatak ===
85°23′S 124°40′W. A nunatak standing 1 nautical mile (1.9 km; 1.2 mi) northwest of Mount Brecher in northern Wisconsin Range, Horlick Mountains. Named by US-ACAN for Travis L. Baker, meteorologist, Byrd Station winter party, 1961.

=== Mount Brecher ===
85°24′S 124°22′W. A jagged rock mountain, 2,100 metres (6,900 ft) high, standing immediately west of Mount LeSchack in northern Wisconsin Range, Horlick Mountains. Named by US-ACAN for Henry H. Brecher, a member of the Byrd Station winter party, 1960, who returned to Antarctica to do glaciological work in several succeeding summer seasons.

=== Angus Nunatak ===
85°22′S 124°14′W. The northern of two nunataks which lie close north of Mount Brecher. Named by US-ACAN for Gordon W. Angus, ionospheric physicist, Byrd Station winter party, 1961.

=== Mount LeSchack ===
85°25′S 124°00′W. A distinctive flat-topped mountain, 2,265 metres (7,431 ft) high, standing on the north side of Perkins Canyon. Named by US-ACAN for Leonard A. LeSchack, traverse seismologist, Byrd Station winter party, 1958.

=== Spencer Nunatak ===
85°21′S 122°11′W. A prominent nunatak 9 nautical miles (17 km; 10 mi) east-northeast of Mount LeSchack, lying between Wisconsin Range and Long Hills in the Horlick Mountains. Named by US-ACAN for Donald J. Spencer, atmospheric noise scientist, Byrd Station winter party, 1958.

=== Widich Nunatak ===
85°20′S 121°25′W. A nunatak 3.5 nautical miles (6.5 km; 4.0 mi) east of Spencer Nunatak, lying between Wisconsin Range and Long Hills in the Horlick Mountains. Named by US-ACAN for George Widich, traverse engineer, Byrd Station winter party, 1960.

== Sources ==
- Alberts, Fred G., ed. (1995), Geographic Names of the Antarctic (PDF) (2 ed.), United States Board on Geographic Names This article incorporates public domain material from websites or documents of the United States Board on Geographic Names.
- Faure, Gunter; Mensing, Teresa M. (21 September 2010), The Transantarctic Mountains: Rocks, Ice, Meteorites and Waterpage, Springer Science & Business Media, ISBN 978-90-481-9390-5
- Wisconsin Range, USGS: United States Geological Survey

This article incorporates public domain material from websites or documents of the United States Geological Survey.
