= Bender Mountains =

Mountain group in Marie Byrd Land, Antarctica

- Location within Antarctica

Geography
- Continent: Antarctica
- Area: Marie Byrd Land
- Range coordinates: 85°31′S 140°12′W

The Bender Mountains (85°31′S 140°12′W) are a small group of mountains 4 nautical miles (7.4 km; 4.6 mi) southwest of the Berry Peaks, between the southeast edge of the Ross Ice Shelf and the Watson Escarpment.

== Exploration and naming ==
The Bender Mountains were mapped by the United States Geological Survey (USGS) from ground surveys and from United States Navy air photos, 1960–63. They were named by the Advisory Committee on Antarctic Names (US-ACAN) for Lieutenant Commander Leslie C. Bender, U.S. Navy, an aircraft commander at McMurdo Station, 1962–63 and 1963–64.}

== Location ==
The Bender Mountains are in a generally flat area south of the Ross Ice Shelf and west of the Reedy Glacier, which enters the ice shelf to the north of the mountains. They are south of the Watson Escarpment and east of the Harold Byrd Mountains, which in turn are east of the Leverett Glacier. Features of the mountains include Mount Fiedler and Mount Mahan. To the northeast are the Berry Peaks including Scallop Ridge and Gallaher Peak. McCaslin Nunatak is to the south.

== Features and nearby features ==
Location between Leverett Glacier and Reedy Glacier

Features in the region were mapped by the United States Geological Survey (USGS) from ground surveys and USN air photos, 1960–63.

=== Mount Fiedler ===
85°33′S 140°41′W. One of the Bender Mountains, 1,140 metres (3,740 ft) high, standing between the edge of Ross Ice Shelf and the Watson Escarpment. Named by US-ACAN for Leonard G. Fiedler, electrician with the Byrd Station winter parties of 1960 and 1964.

=== Mount Mahan ===
85°32′S 140°04′W. Mountain 1,260 metres (4,130 ft) high, standing 3 nautical miles (5.6 km; 3.5 mi) east of Mount Fiedler in the Bender Mountains. Named by US-ACAN for Shirley F. Mahan, radioman with the Byrd Station winter party, 1960.

=== Berry Peaks ===
85°26′S 138°32′W. Small group of peaks 10 nautical miles (19 km; 12 mi) south of the terminus of Reedy Glacier, between the southeast edge of the Ross Ice Shelf and Watson Escarpment. Named by US-ACAN for William Berry, radioman, Byrd Station winter party of 1961.

=== Scallop Ridge ===
85°26′S 139°00′W. An undulating ridge, 3 nautical miles (5.6 km; 3.5 mi) long, forming the southwest portion of the Berry Peaks. Mapped by USGS from ground surveys and United States Navy air photos 1960-63. Named by US-ACAN. The name is descriptive of the curving outline of the ridge.

=== Gallaher Peak ===
85°27′S 138°18′W. One of the Berry Peaks, 1,005 metres (3,297 ft) high, standing between the southeast edge of the Ross Ice Shelf and Watson Escarpment. Named by US-ACAN after James T. Gallaher, electrician with the Byrd Station winter party, 1958.

=== McCaslin Nunatak ===
85°38′S 140°57′W. Isolated nunatak 5 nautical miles (9.3 km; 5.8 mi) south of the west end of the Bender Mountains. Named by US-ACAN for James C. McCaslin, a member of the U.S. Army Aviation Unit which supported the USGS Topo East survey in 1962-63.

== Sources ==
- Alberts, Fred G., ed. (1995), Geographic Names of the Antarctic (PDF) (2 ed.), United States Board on Geographic Names This article incorporates public domain material from websites or documents of the United States Board on Geographic Names.
- Leverett Glacier, USGS: United States Geological Survey
- This article incorporates public domain material from websites or documents of the United States Geological Survey.
