= Caloplaca Hills =

Mountain range in Antarctica

- Location within Antarctica

Geography
- Continent: Antarctica
- Area: Marie Byrd Land
- Range coordinates: 86°7′S 131°0′W
- Parent range: Horlick Mountains (?)

The Caloplaca Hills (86°7′S 131°0′W) are a distinctive group of rock hills including Mount Carmer and Heathcock Peak, lying east of the Watson Escarpment on the west side of Reedy Glacier.

== Exploration and naming ==
The Caloplaca Hills were mapped by the United States Geological Survey (USGS) from surveys and from United States Navy aerial photographs, 1960–64. The name was suggested by John H. Mercer of the Institute of Polar Studies, Ohio State University, after Caloplaca, the type of lichen found here.

== Location ==
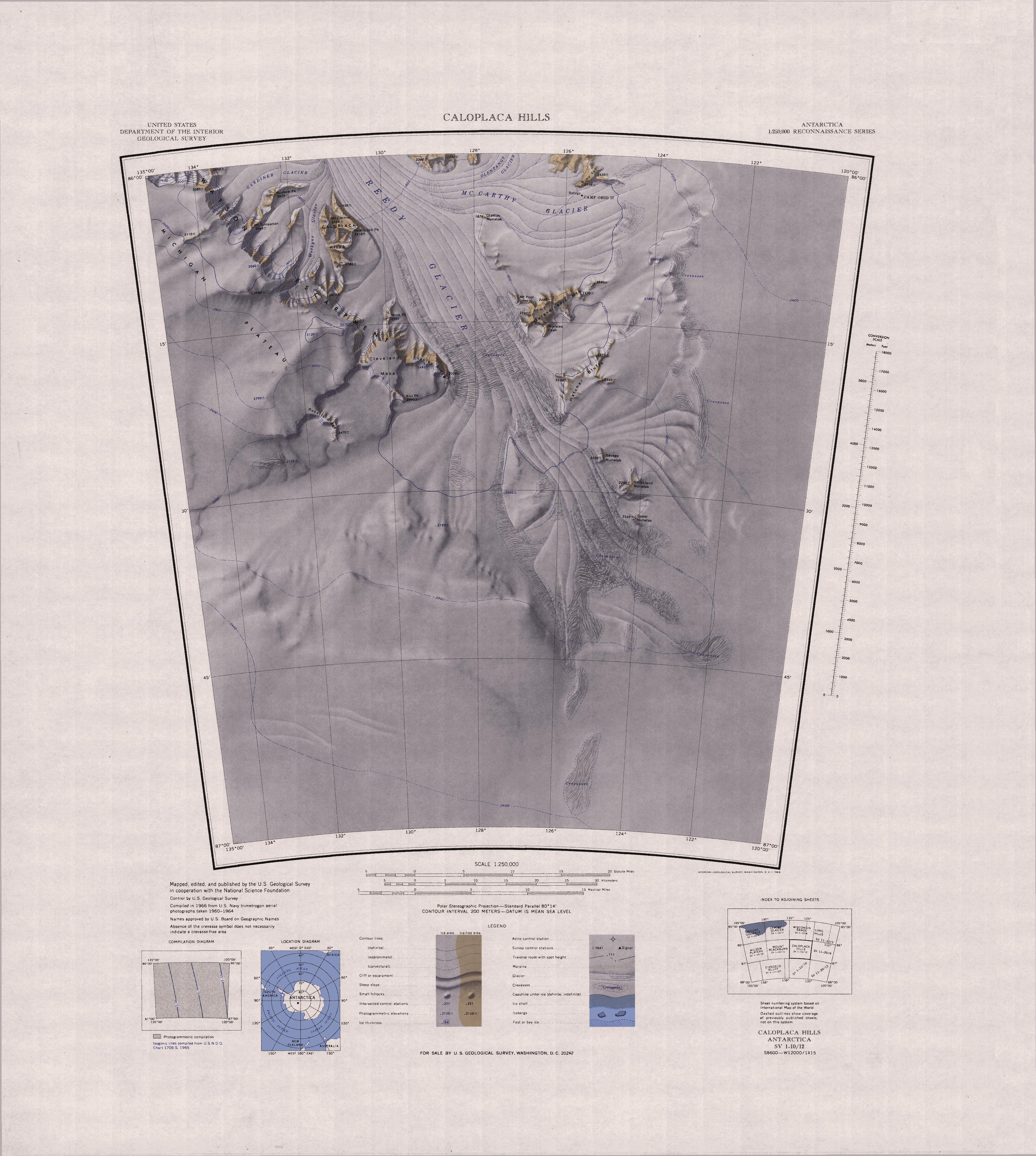
Caloplaca Hills towards the northwest of map

The Caloplaca Hills lie to the west of the Reedy Glacier, east of the Wotkyns Glacier, which flows north into the Reedy Glacier from the eastern part of the Watson Escarpment. They include Mount Carmer and Heathcock Peak. A 2005 map by Davis and Blankenship shows the Horlick Mountains including the eastern part of the Queen Maud Mountains and most of the Wisconsin Range. The Wisconsin Range may be taken to include the Watson Escarpment south of the Kansas Glacier, the Quartz Hills, the Caloplaca Hills and the Cleveland Mesa, all in the Queen Maud Mountains to the west of the Reedy Glacier.

== Features ==
=== Mount Carmer ===
86°06′S 131°11′W. A mountain on the east side of Wotkyns Glacier, standing 2 nautical miles (3.7 km; 2.3 mi) west-northwest of Heathcock Peak. Mapped by USGS from surveys and USN air photos, 1960–64. Named by the United States Advisory Committee on Antarctic Names (US-ACAN) for John L. Carmer, electronics technician at Byrd Station in 1962.

=== Heathcock Peak ===
86°07′S 130°40′W. A peak, 2,310 metres (7,580 ft) high, located in the east part of Caloplaca Hills and overlooking the west edge of Reedy Glacier. Mapped by USGS from surveys and United States Navy air photos, 1960-64. Named by US-ACAN for Joe D. Heathcock, builder at Byrd Station in 1962.

== Sources ==
- Alberts, Fred G., ed. (1995), Geographic Names of the Antarctic (PDF) (2 ed.), United States Board on Geographic Names This article incorporates public domain material from websites or documents of the United States Board on Geographic Names.
- Caloplaca Hills, USGS: United States Geological Survey
- Faure, Gunter; Mensing, Teresa M. (21 September 2010), The Transantarctic Mountains: Rocks, Ice, Meteorites and Waterpage, Springer Science & Business Media, ISBN 978-90-481-9390-5

This article incorporates public domain material from websites or documents of the United States Geological Survey.
