= David Harold Byrd =

Petroleum producer (1900–1986)

David Harold "Dry Hole" Byrd (24 April 1900 – 14 September 1986) was a noted Texan producer of petroleum, and a co-founder of the Civil Air Patrol. Byrd's cousin, polar explorer Richard E. Byrd, named Antarctica's Harold Byrd Mountains for him.

== Personal background ==
Byrd was born in Detroit, Texas on April 24, 1900, the youngest of eight children of Mary Easley Byrd and Edward Byrd, and grew up in Texas and Oklahoma. Byrd's cousin, polar explorer Richard E. Byrd, named Antarctica's Harold Byrd Mountains for him, after Byrd had contributed to the expedition that found them. Another cousin (Richard's brother) was Harry F. Byrd, who became a Democratic Party Governor of Virginia and a leading conservative US Senator.

Byrd worked in the Burkburnett, Texas oilfield before attending Trinity University in 1917 and studying geology at the University of Texas in 1919–1921. During the summer vacations he worked at an oilfield in Santa Anna, Texas.

Byrd married twice; on June 8, 1935, he married Mattie Caruth (March 7, 1908 to February 15, 1972) and again on February 14, 1974 – on her birthday – to the widow Mavis Barnett Heath (February 14, 1908 to April 9, 1998) following the death of his first wife in 1972. He had two sons from his first marriage. The two sons were David Harold Byrd Jr. and Caruth Clark Byrd.

Mavis Barnett Heath was the widow of William Womack Heath (December 7, 1903 to June 22, 1971) and this couple were close friends to Lyndon B. Johnson and his wife, Lady Bird Johnson. This Heath couple were instrumental in bringing the LBJ Library to the University of Texas.

Alongside his fellow Texan businessmen H.L. Hunt, Stanley Marcus and Roy Mark Hofheinz, Byrd was a subject of the 1968 BBC documentary The Plutocrats, about the ultra-rich of Texas.

On September 14, 1986, Byrd died while living in the City of Dallas.

== Oil business career ==
After graduation, Byrd worked for H.E. Humphreys, and as a geological oil scout for several oil companies including Old Dominion Oil Company of San Antonio before becoming, in 1925, an independent consultant and driller in Brownwood, Texas. Here he acquired his "dry hole" nickname by drilling 56 wells that produced no oil. Then, on 28 May 1928, he drilled two productive wells in the Byrd-Daniels Oil Field on the same day. One of those wells produced 1,000 barrels per day at a selling price of $3 a barrel. Byrd was the president of the Independent Petroleum Association of Texas and a member of the American Association of Petroleum Geologists.

In 1931, Byrd founded Byrd-Frost Incorporated with Jack Frost, which operated 492 East Texas wells that produced an average of 4,000 barrels a day. In the 1930s he purchased the Texas School Book Depository in Dallas, scene of the 1963 assassination of John F. Kennedy. After the assassination Byrd had the window from which Oswald was said to have fired from removed and displayed in his Dallas mansion. His son said that his father was afraid that the window would be stolen by souvenir hunters. In 1970 Byrd put the building up for sale in a public auction.

== Aviation business ==
During this period Byrd became very interested in aviation. In 1938 he was named to the Texas Civil Aeronautics Commission by Texas Governor James V. Allred, and was involved in founding the Civil Air Patrol (CAP) in September 1941. During World War II Byrd commanded a CAP anti-submarine base at Beaumont, Texas. Byrd was concerned that the Germans or those working for them may be using the Southern border to travel back and forth through the United States, so he hired an ex-soldier to deal with his concerns. Suspicious foreigners were tracked for months and Byrd passed on the information he gathered to the authorities.

After the war Byrd helped incorporate CAP and have it designated as an Auxiliary of the Air Force, helped initiate the International Air Cadet Exchange, and established or supported cadet scholarships. For his work with the CAP Byrd was awarded the US Air Force's Air Force Scroll of Appreciation on 24 May 1963. He was a close friend of the famed aviator Jimmy Doolittle, who he went on hunting trips with.

In 1957 he founded and became chairman of the board of Space Corporation, a jet engine equipment company.

== LTV ==
In 1944 Byrd founded Byrd Oil Corporation, which was later sold to Mobil Oil. That year he also founded B.H. Drilling Corporation. Byrd's Three States Natural Gas Company was sold to Delhi-Taylor Oil Corporation in 1961.

In 1952 Byrd established the Three States Natural Gas Company, which he later sold to Delhi-Taylor, using the money to invest in aircraft production, co-founding Temco Aircraft, which in 1961 merged with friend James Ling's electronics company and aircraft manufacturer Chance Vought Corporation to form Ling-Temco-Vought (LTV).

Byrd established a relationship with his fellow Texan Lyndon B. Johnson, later to be President Johnson. He bragged in his autobiography that Johnson was "among the men I could go to at any time that I wanted action", Johnson in turn said that it was "wonderful" to have Byrd's friendship. Then-Senator Johnson aided Byrd's aerospace endeavors by helping him secure government contracts and Byrd in return made donations to his political campaigns. Throughout the 1950s and 60s they corresponded with one another, in 1965 Johnson wrote to Byrd that "You've done so much to be helpful to me. I can never thank you enough".

== Books ==
- I'm an Endangered Species: The Autobiography of a Free Enterpriser, Pacesetter Press, 1978, ISBN 978-0884152583
