= Heathcock Peak =

Mountain peak in Marie Byrd Land, Antarctica

Heathcock Peak (86°7′S 130°40′W) is a peak, 2,310 metres (7,580 ft) high, located in the eastern part of the Caloplaca Hills in Antarctica and overlooking the western edge of Reedy Glacier. It was mapped by the United States Geological Survey from surveys and U.S. Navy air photos, 1960–64, and was named by the Advisory Committee on Antarctic Names for Joe D. Heathcock, a U.S. Navy Seabee, stationed at Byrd Station in 1962.
