= Alaska Canyon =

Canyon in Marie Byrd Land, Antarctica

Coordinates: 86°0′S 136°33′W

Alaska Canyon is a deeply incised canyon in the north face of Michigan Plateau, Antarctica. Mapped by United States Geological Survey from ground surveys and U.S. Navy air photos, 1960–63. Named by Advisory Committee on Antarctic Names for the University of Alaska, which sent researchers to Antarctica.
