= Harold Byrd Mountains =

Mountain group in Marie Byrd Land, Antarctica

- Location within Antarctica

Highest point
- Elevation: 222 m (728 ft)

Geography
- Continent: Antarctica
- Range coordinates: 85°26′S 146°30′W

The Harold Byrd Mountains (85°26′S 146°30′W) are a group of exposed mountains and nunataks which extend in an east–west direction between the lower part of Leverett Glacier and the head of the Ross Ice Shelf in Antarctica. They were discovered in December 1929 by the Byrd Antarctic Expedition geological party under Laurence Gould, and named by Rear Admiral Richard E. Byrd for D. Harold Byrd, a cousin of his and a contributor towards the purchase of furs for the expedition.

== Location ==
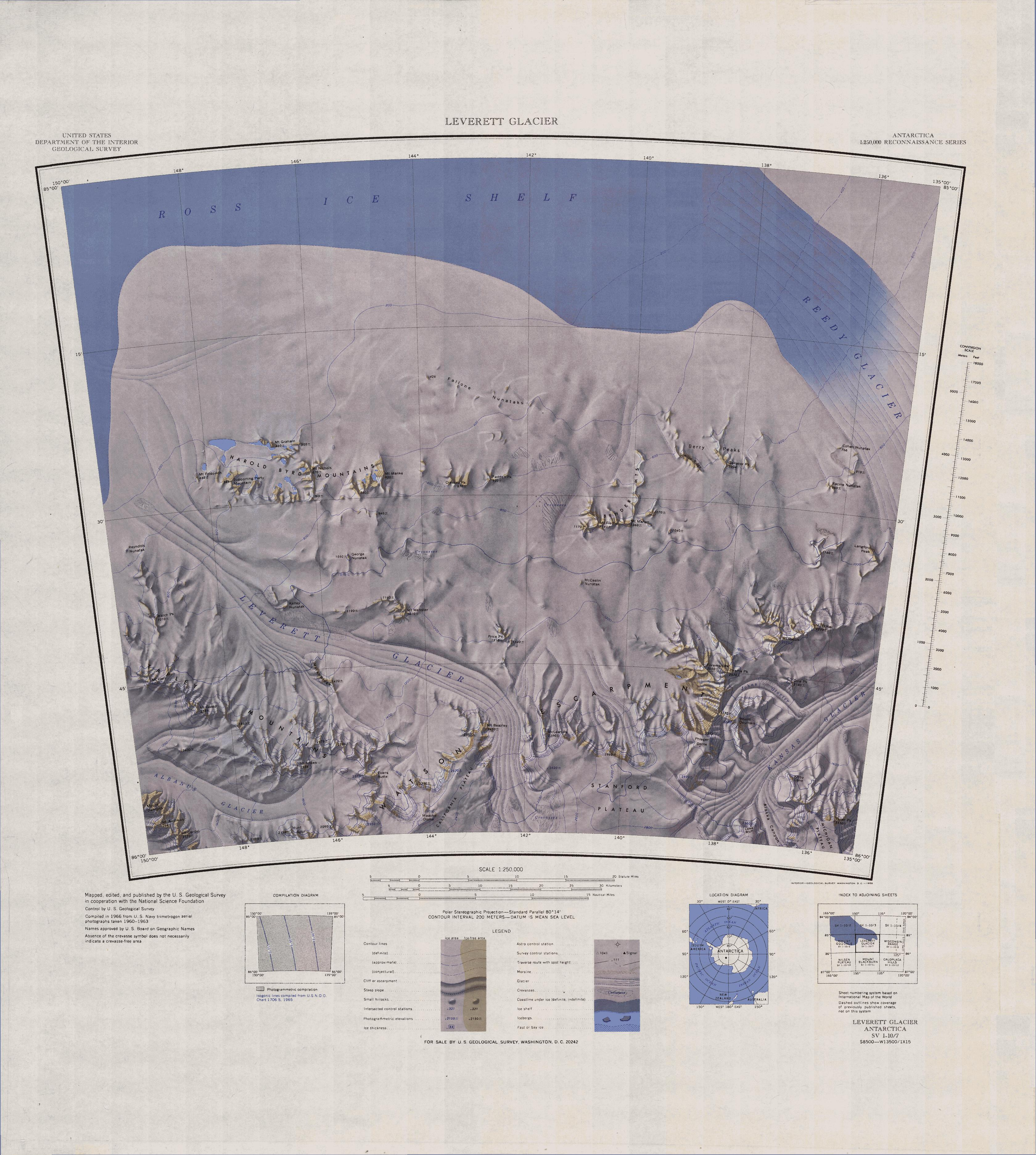
Harold Byrd Mountains in west north of center of map

The Harold Byrd Mountains are in relatively flat country to the northeast of the lower reaches of the Leverett Glacier, and to the south of the Ross Ice Shelf. Features include, from west to east, Mount Fridovich, Supporting Party Mountain, Mount Graham, Mount Nichols, Mount Manke, Cresley Peak and Fadden Peak. The Fallone Nunataks are to the north, and the Bender Mountains are to the east. Mount Webster is to the south.

== Features ==
=== Mount Fridovich ===
85°27′S 148°12′W. A small mountain, 440 metres (1,440 ft) high, standing at the north side of the terminus of Leverett Glacier and marking the west limit of Harold Byrd Mountains. Named by the United States Advisory Committee on Antarctic Names (US-ACAN) for Lt. (j.g.) Bernard Fridovich, United States Navy, meteorologist with the winter party at McMurdo Sound, 1957.

=== Supporting Party Mountain ===
85°27′S 147°33′W. A mountain, 560 metres (1,840 ft) high, standing 3 nautical miles (5.6 km; 3.5 mi) east of Mount Fridovich in the Harold Byrd Mountains. Discovered in December 1929 by members of theByrd Antarctic Expedition Geological Sledging Party under Laurence Gould. Named by them in appreciation of the splendid cooperative work of their Supporting Party. The mountain was climbed by members of Gould's party who took panoramic photographs from the summit.

=== Mount Hanson ===
85°28′S 147°26′W. A mountain rising to 800 metres (2,600 ft) high, standing 1 nautical mile (1.9 km; 1.2 mi) southeast of Supporting Party Mountain in the Harold Byrd Mountains. Discovered in December 1929 by theByrd Antarctic Expedition geological party under Laurence Gould, and named by R. Admiral Byrd for Malcolm P. Hanson, chief radio engineer of the expedition, and a pioneer in the development of radio communication apparatus for polar regions.

=== Mount Graham ===
85°25′S 146°45′W. Mountain 460 metres (1,510 ft) high, in the north part of the Harold Byrd Mountains. Named by US-ACAN for Lt. Cdr. R.E. Graham, officer in charge of the winter-over detachment of United States Navy Squadron VX-6 at Little America V, 1956.

=== Mount Nichols ===
85°27′S 146°05′W. Mountain, 670 metres (2,200 ft) high, in the central part of the Harold Byrd Mountains. Mapped by the United States Geological Survey (USGS) from ground surveys and United States Navy air photos, 1960-63. Named by US-ACAN for William L. Nichols, construction mechanic with the Byrd Station winter party in 1957.

=== Mount Manke ===
85°28′S 144°42′W. A mountain, 900 metres (3,000 ft) high, marking the east limit of the Harold Byrd Mountains. Mapped by USGS from ground surveys and United States Navy air photos, 1960-63. Named by US-ACAN for Robert M. Manke, utilitiesman with the Byrd Station winter party in 1960.

== Nearby features ==
=== Cressey Peak ===
85°29′S 143°10′W. Peak, 870 metres (2,850 ft) high, located 7 nautical miles (13 km; 8.1 mi) east of Harold Byrd Mountains between the southeast edge of the Ross Ice Shelf and Watson Escarpment. Mapped by USGS from ground surveys and United States Navy air photos, 1960-63. Named by US-ACAN for Richard N. Cressey, storekeeper with the Byrd Station winter party in 1958.

=== Fadden Peak ===
85°29′S 142°43′W. Peak, 920 metres (3,020 ft) high, located 2 nautical miles (3.7 km; 2.3 mi) east of Cressey Peak, between the southeast edge of the Ross Ice Shelf and Watson Escarpment. Named by US-ACAN for Dean E. Fadden, utilitiesman with the Byrd Station winter party, 1958.

=== Ivory Tower ===
85°28′S 142°24′W. A small peak rising to c. 800 metres (2,600 ft) high, 1.5 nautical miles (2.8 km; 1.7 mi) east of Fadden Peak, between Harold Byrd Mountains and Bender Mountains. The peak was visited by a USARP-Arizona State University geological party, 1977-78, and so named from its composition of nearly all white marble.

=== Fallone Nunataks ===
85°21′S 142°54′W. A chain of nunataks 10 nautical miles (19 km; 12 mi) long, located 10 nautical miles (19 km; 12 mi) northeast of Harold Byrd Mountains, between the edge of Ross Ice Shelf and Watson Escarpment. Named by US-ACAN for Lt. (jg) Paul R. Fallone, Jr., United States Navy, aide to the Commander, U.S. Naval Support Force, Antarctica, 1962.

=== Dirtbag Nunatak ===
85°32′S 144°52′W. A ridge-like nunatak rising to 940 metres (3,080 ft) high, 3.5 nautical miles (6.5 km; 4.0 mi) south-southwest of Mount Manke, Harold Byrd Mountains. The feature was mapped by USGS from ground surveys and United States Navy aerial photographs, 1960-63. It was visited in 1977-78 by a USARP-Arizona State University geological party, led by Edmund Stump, and named in the spirit of Coalsack Bluff (q.v.); thin lenses of disintegrating mica and schist form a type of light soil on the slopes of thenunatak.

=== Mount Webster ===
85°40′S 144°24′W. Prominent isolated mountain, 1,610 metres (5,280 ft) high, standing 3 nautical miles (5.6 km; 3.5 mi) north of Leverett Glacier and 12 nautical miles (22 km; 14 mi) northwest of Mount Beazley. Mapped by USGS from ground surveys and United States Navy air photos, 1960-63. Named by US-ACAN for Lt. John B. Webster, United States Navy, flight surgeon with the McMurdo Station winter party in 1962.

== Sources ==
- Alberts, Fred G., ed. (1995), Geographic Names of the Antarctic (PDF) (2 ed.), United States Board on Geographic Names This article incorporates public domain material from websites or documents of the United States Board on Geographic Names.
- Leverett Glacier, USGS: United States Geological Survey
- This article incorporates public domain material from websites or documents of the United States Geological Survey.
