= Metavolcanic rock =

Metamorphic rock from a volcanic precursor

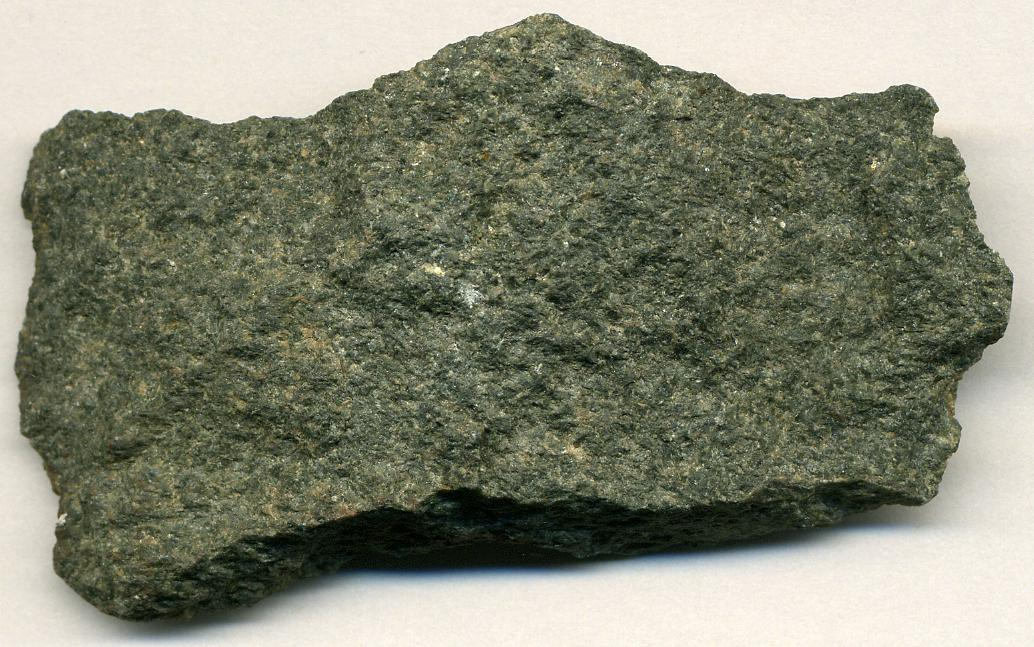
Metavolcanic rock (a metabasalt) from Michigan, US

Well preserved flow bands from an eruption ~560 Ma on a metarhyodacite rock from Morrow Mountain North Carolina

Metavolcanic rocks are volcanic rocks that have experienced metamorphism. In other words, the rock was originally produced by a volcano, either as lava or tephra. The rock was then subjected to high pressure, high temperature or both, for example by burial under younger rocks, causing the original volcanic rock to recrystallize. Metavolcanic rocks are sometimes described informally as metavolcanics.

When it is possible to determine the original volcanic rock type from the properties of the metavolcanic rock (particularly if the degree of metamorphism is slight), the rock is more precisely named by appylying the prefix meta- to the original rock type. For example, a weakly metamorphosed basalt would be described as a metabasalt, or a weakly metamorphosed tuff as a metatuff.

Metavolcanic rock is commonly found in greenstone belts.

== See also ==
- Metasedimentary rock – Metamorphic rock from a sedimentary precursor
- Metavolcanic Mountain – Mountain in Marie Byrd Land, Antarctica
