= Eblen Hills =

Cluster of Antarctic rock hills

The Eblen Hills (85°51′S 133°28′W) are a cluster of precipitous rock hills in Antarctica, rising to 1,640 metres (5,380 ft) just north of the mouth of Colorado Glacier where the latter enters the west side of Reedy Glacier. They were mapped by the United States Geological Survey from surveys and from U.S. Navy air photos, 1960–64, and were named by the Advisory Committee on Antarctic Names for James C. Eblen, an aviation machinist with the McMurdo Station winter party of 1959, and a participant in several U.S. Navy Deep Freeze expeditions.
