= Reedy Glacier =

Glacier in Antarctica

- Location within Antarctica
- Location: Marie Byrd Land
- Coordinates: 85°30′S 134°00′W
- Length: 100 nautical miles (190 km; 120 mi)
- Width: 6 to 12 nautical miles (11 to 22 km; 6.9 to 13.8 mi)
- Terminus: Ross Ice Shelf

The Reedy Glacier (85°30′S 134°00′W) is a major glacier in Antarctica, over 100 nautical miles (190 km; 120 mi) long and 6 to 12 nautical miles (11 to 22 km; 6.9 to 13.8 mi) wide, descending from the polar plateau to the Ross Ice Shelf between the Michigan Plateau and Wisconsin Range in the Transantarctic Mountains. It marks the limits of the Queen Maud Mountains on the west and the Horlick Mountains on the east.

== Naming ==
The Reedy Glacier was mapped by United States Geological Survey (USGS) from surveys and United States Navy (USN) air photos, 1960–64. It was named by the Advisory Committee on Antarctic Names (US-ACAN) for Rear Admiral James R. Reedy, USN, Commander, U.S. Naval Support Force, Antarctica, from November 1962 until April 1965.

== Topography and ice flow ==
The Reedy Glacier is the most southern large glacier that drains ice through the Transantarctic mountains from the Antarctic Plateau. It drains about 25,000 square kilometres (9,700 sq mi) of the polar plateau, with its catchment extending from 200 kilometres (120 mi) south of the South Pole. It flows 140 kilometres (87 mi) from the edge of the polar plateau at 86°30′S 140°00′W to become the Mercer Ice Stream at 85°S 140°W in the southeast corner of the Ross Sea embayment. It is the only large glacier that flows from the Transantarctic mountains into grounded ice in the Ross Sea, although during the Last Glacial Maximum other glaciers also flowed into grounded ice.

The Reedy Glacier is almost 20 kilometres (12 mi) wide at its head and its mouth. It narrows to 9 kilometres (5.6 mi) in the central section, where for 15 kilometres (9.3 mi) it flows past cliffs that rise 200 to 600 metres (660 to 1,970 ft) above the glacier surface. The Wisconsin Range to the east and the Queen Maud Mountains to the west holds peaks that rise over 2,000 metres (6,600 ft) above sea level. At the head of the glacier the ice surface is almost 2,000 metres (6,600 ft) above sea level, while at its mouth it is 600 metres (2,000 ft) above sea level. Ice thickness is up to 2,000 metres (6,600 ft).

At the Quartz Hills the center-line velocity is 170 metres (560 ft) per year. Elsewhere center-line velocities range from 100 to 200 metres (330 to 660 ft) per year. Kansas Glacier is the largest tributary, joining the Reedy Glacier 100 kilometres (62 mi) from its head. Other tributaries contribute little to the volume of ice flow. After entering the Ross Ice Shelf the Reedy Glacier becomes the Mercer Ice Stream. In the past it has been at least 250 metres (820 ft) thicker than at present.

During the last 290 Ma the glacier has expanded at least six times, each time less than before, with the last expansion during the Last Glacial Maximum, when the ice sheet was up to 500 metres (1,600 ft) thicker than today. The glacier flows into the ice sheet about 100 kilometres (62 mi) behind the Ross Sea grounding line, so the flow and thickness of the glacier are, at least in part, controlled by the damming effest of the West Antarctic Ice Sheet. Reedy Glacier was considerably thicker than it is today at several times in the mid to late Cenozoic. For at least five million years the changes of thickness correlate with changes in thickness of the West Antarctic Ice Sheet.

== Course ==
From the polar plateau the Reedy Glacier flows north past the Spear Nunatak, Strickland Nunatak and Savage Nunatak. It passes the Metavolcanic Mountain to the east and the Watson Escarpment to the west. Past the Gratton Nunatak it is joined from the east by the McCarthy Glacier and the Olentangy Glacier. It is joined from the west by the Wotkyns Glacier and the Gardiner Glacier flowing from the Watson Escarpment. It flows northwest past the Wisconsin Range to the east, from which it receives the Norfolk Glacier and the Hueneme Glacier. Past the Quartz Hills to the west it receives the Colorado Glacier.

Below Blubaugh Nunatak the Reedy Glacier is joined from the west by the large Kansas Glacier. The Kansas Glacier originates on the Stanford Plateau and is fed by the Johns Glacier from the south and Alaska Canyon from the north. The Reedy Glacier continues north past the Ford Nunataks to the east and Abbey Nunatak and Penrod Nunatak to the west. Near its termination it is joined from the east by the Horlick Ice Stream just after that has joined the Davisville Glacier, which has been joined by the Quonset Glacier from the east further upstream. The Reedy Glacier flows northwest past Racine Nunatak and Cohen Nunatak to the west before entering the Ross Ice Shelf.

Except where otherwise stated, the features of the Reedy Glacier region, described below, were mapped by the United States Geological Survey (USGS) from surveys and United States Navy air photos, 1960–64.

== Left tributaries ==
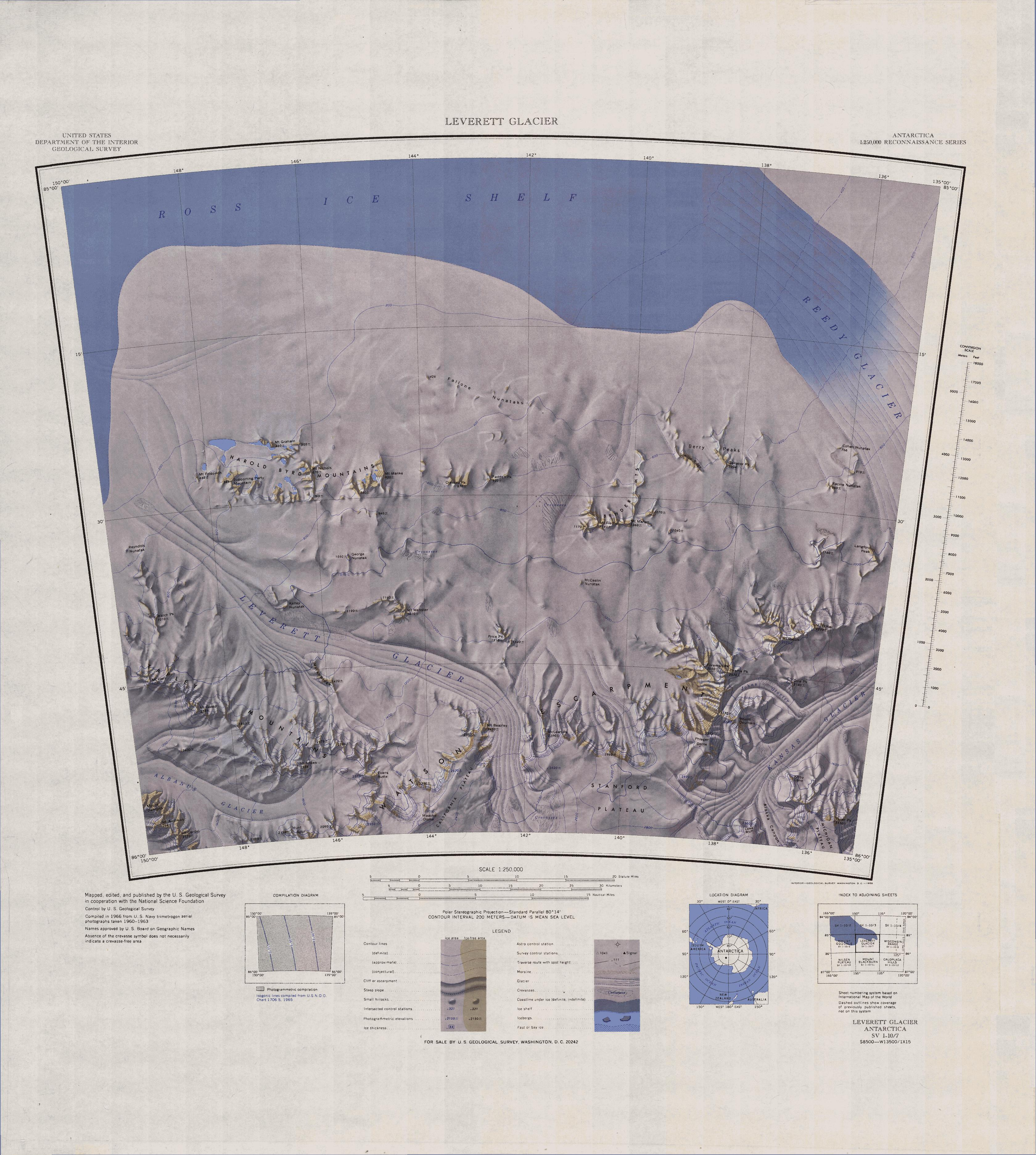
Mouth of Reedy Glacier (northeast of map)

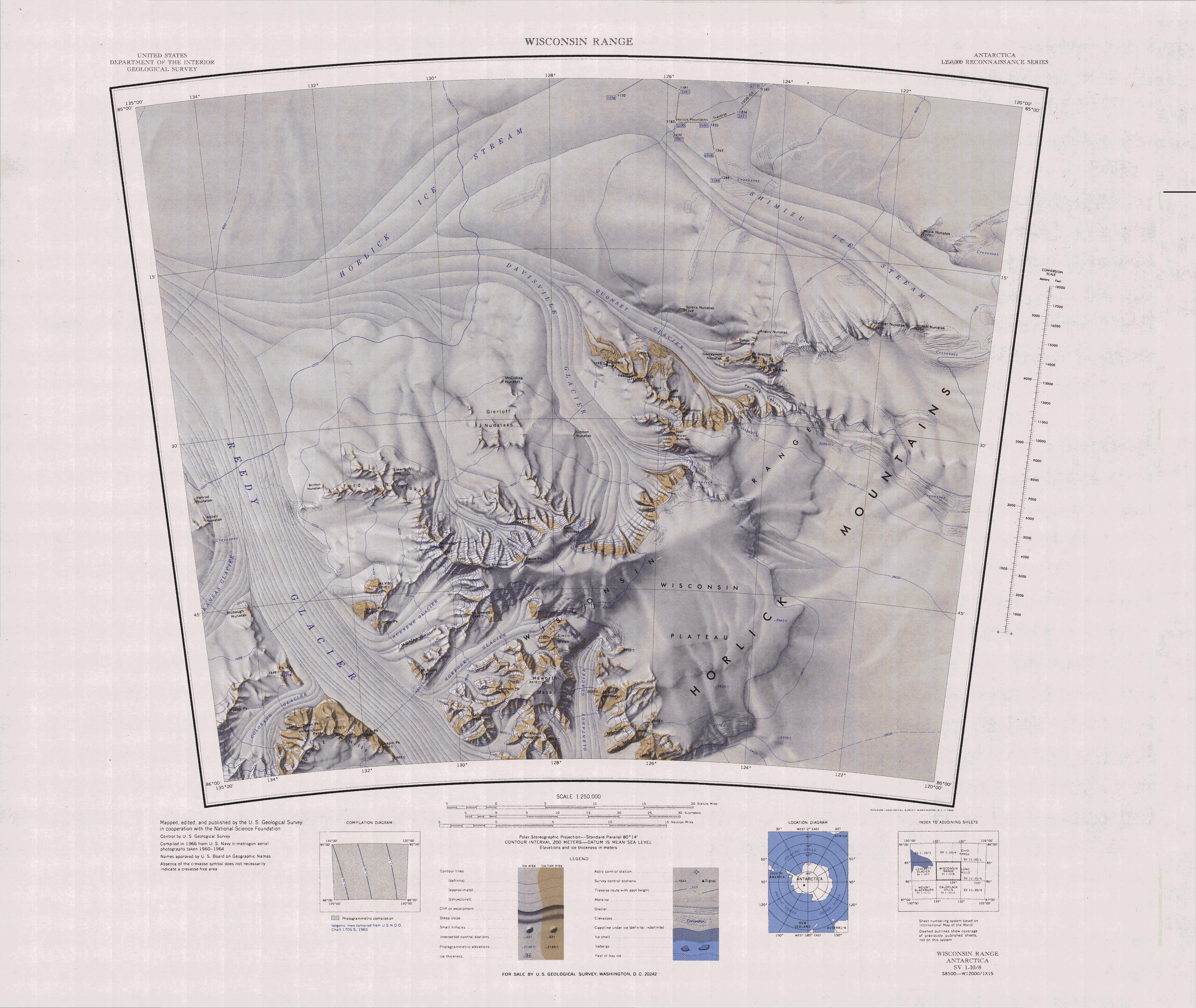
Central Reedy Glacier (west of map)

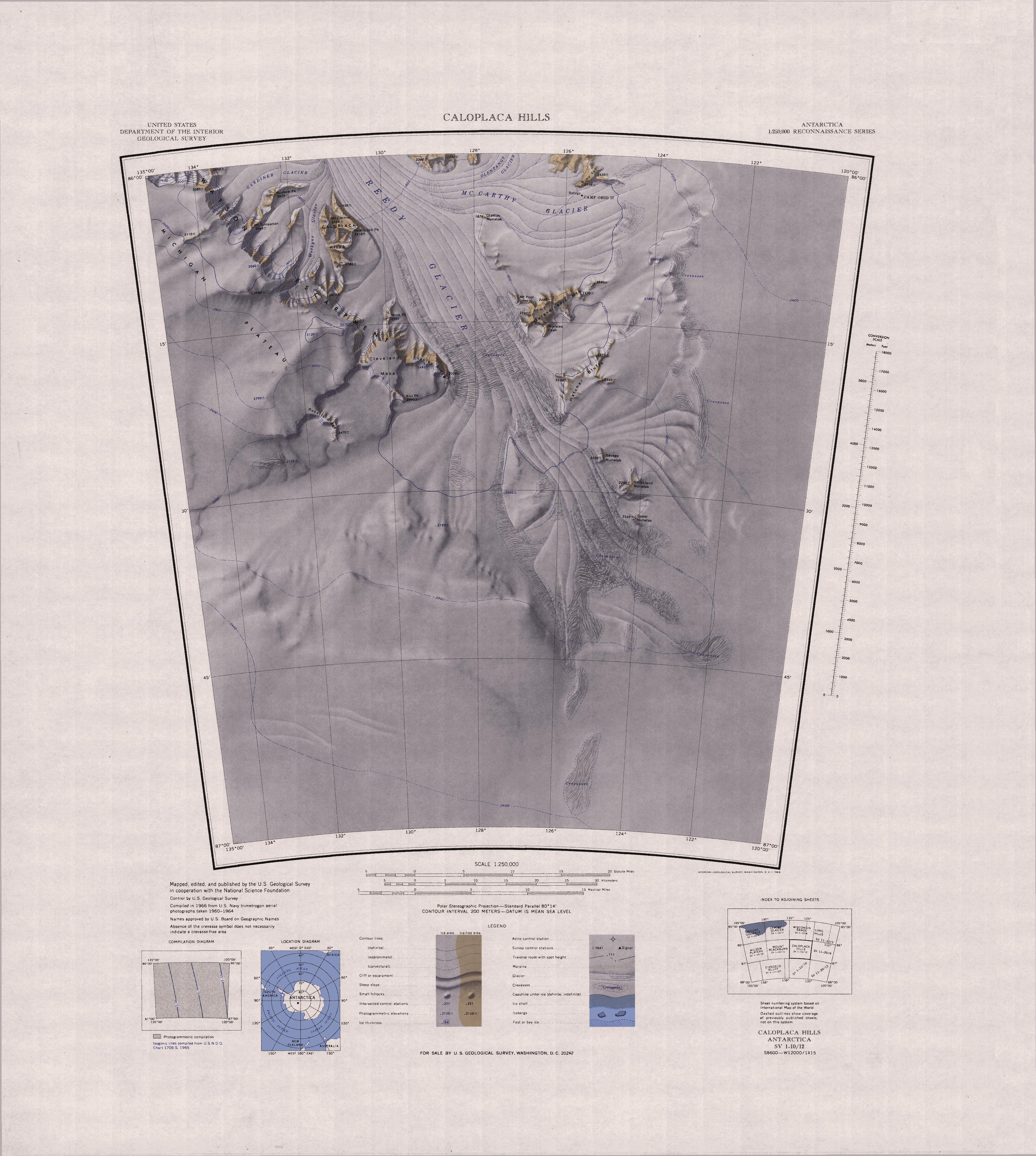
Upper Reedy Glacier (center of map)

Left (west) tributaries are, from south to north:

=== Wotkyns Glacier ===
86°04′S 131°25′W, A glacier flowing north from Michigan Plateau along the west side of Caloplaca Hills to enter the Reedy Glacier. Named by US-ACAN for Grosenvar S. Wotkyns, hospital corpsman at Byrd Station in 1962.

=== Gardiner Glacier ===
86°01′S 131°48′W. A glacier at the south side of Quartz Hills, flowing east from Watson Escarpment into Reedy Glacier. Named by US-ACAN for Richard D. Gardiner, construction electrician at Byrd Station in 1962.

=== Colorado Glacier ===
85°53′S 133°05′W. A tributary glacier, 10 nautical miles (19 km; 12 mi) long, draining northeast from Michigan Plateau to enter Reedy Glacier between the Quartz Hills and Eblen Hills. Named by US-ACAN for the University of Colorado Boulder, which has sent a number of research personnel to Antarctica.

=== Kansas Glacier ===
85°42′S 134°30′W. A steep glacier, 25 nautical miles (46 km; 29 mi) long, draining northeast from Stanford Plateau to enter Reedy Glacier just north of Blubaugh Nunatak. Named by US-ACAN for the University of Kansas, Lawrence, KS, which has sent a number of research personnel to Antarctica.

=== Johns Glacier ===
85°48′S 136°30′W. An arc-shaped glacier 8 nautical miles (15 km; 9.2 mi) long in the northern part of Watson Escarpment. It drains eastward around the northern side of Mount Doumani to join the Kansas Glacier. Named by US-ACAN for Lt. Ernest H. Johns, USN, a participant in several deployments of Operation Deep Freeze, 1955-68.

== Right tributaries ==
Right (east) tributaries are, from south to north:

=== McCarthy Glacier ===
86°04′S 127°24′W. A broad glacier at the south side of Wisconsin Plateau, flowing west to merge with the lower part of Olentangy Glacier before entering Reedy Glacier just southwest of Mount McNaughton. Named by US-ACAN for Lt. Robert J. McCarthy, USN, pilot on flights to the general area during Operation Highjump, 1946-47.

=== Olentangy Glacier ===
86°00′S 127°20′W. A glacier draining that portion of the Wisconsin Plateau of the Horlick Mountains that stands east-north-east of Sisco Mesa, flowing south to merge into McCarthy Glacier and the larger Reedy Glacier to the southwest of Mount McNaughton. The name was proposed by the Ohio State University geological party to the Horlick Mountains, 1964-65. The Olentangy River flows through the University campus.

=== Norfolk Glacier ===
85°53′S 130°18′W. A glacier, 12 nautical miles (22 km; 14 mi) long, draining westward from Wisconsin Range to enter Reedy Glacier between Mount Soyat and Mount Bolton. Named by US-ACAN after Norfolk, VA, location of Detachment Three, the Meteorological Support Unit of the U.S. Naval Support Force, Antarctica.

=== Hueneme Glacier ===
85°49′S 131°15′W. A glacier, 8 nautical miles (15 km; 9.2 mi) long, draining westward from Wisconsin Range to enter Reedy Glacier between Griffith Peak and Mickler Spur. Named by US-ACAN for Port Hueneme, CA, location of the Construction Battalion Center which handles west coast cargo for USN Deep Freeze Operations.

=== Horlick Ice Stream ===
85°17′S 132°00′W. A large ice stream on the featureless ice surface to the north of the main mass of the Horlick Mountains, draining west-southwestward, paralleling these mountains, to enter the lower portion of the Reedy Glacier. Named by US-ACAN in association with Horlick Mountains.

=== Davisville Glacier ===
85°17′S 128°30′W. A glacier about 30 nautical miles (56 km; 35 mi) long which drains the north slopes of the Wisconsin Range, between Lentz Buttress and Moran Buttress, and trends northwestward to merge with the lower portion of the Horlick Ice Stream. Named by US-ACAN for Davisville, Rhode Island, location of the Construction Battalion Center responsible for cargo matters for USN Operation Deep Freeze on the east coast.

=== Quonset Glacier ===
85°19′S 127°05′W. A glacier about 20 nautical miles (37 km; 23 mi) long which drains the north slopes of Wisconsin Range between Mount LeSchack and Ruseski Buttress and trends west-northwest to enter the north side of Davisville Glacier. Named by US-ACAN after the Naval Air Station, Quonset Point, Rhode Island, home base of Antarctic Development Squadron Six (VXE-6).

== Features ==
Nunataks and other isolated features along the course of the glacier were mapped by USGS from surveys and United States Navy air photos, 1960–64. They include, from south to north:

=== Spear Nunatak ===
86°32′S 124°06′W. A nunatak lying 3 nautical miles (5.6 km; 3.5 mi) south of Strickland Nunatak; apparently being the farthest south outcrop along the east side of the head of Reedy Glacier. Named by US-ACAN for Milton B. Spear, construction electrician, a member of the wintering party at Byrd Station in 1962.

=== Strickland Nunatak ===
86°29′S 124°12′W. A large nunatak between Savage Nunatak and Spear Nunatak at the head of Reedy Glacier. Named by US-ACAN for Ernest E. Strickland, utilitiesman at Byrd Station in 1962.

=== Savage Nunatak ===
86°27′S 124°58′W. A nunatak located 7 nautical miles (13 km; 8.1 mi) southeast of Hatcher Bluffs, along the east margin of upper Reedy Glacier. Named by US-ACAN for Henry C. Savage, builder at Byrd Station in 1962.

=== Hatcher Bluffs ===
86°20′S 125°36′W. A line of bluffs facing northwest, located 5 nautical miles (9.3 km; 5.8 mi) south of Metavolcanic Mountain, at the east side of Reedy Glacier. Named by US-ACAN for Julius O. Hatcher, construction mechanic at Byrd Station in 1962.

=== Morales Peak ===
86°15′S 126°22′W. A peak which rises from the south part of Metavolcanic Mountain, just east of Reedy Glacier. Named by US-ACAN for Tommy S. Morales, radioman at Byrd Station in 1962.

=== Metavolcanic Mountain ===
86°13′S 126°15′W A large flat-topped mountain, 2,480 metres (8,140 ft) high located 5 nautical miles (9.3 km; 5.8 mi) north of Hatcher Bluffs on the east side of Reedy Glacier. Composed of dark metavolcanic rock, this mountain contrasts with lighter-colored granites elsewhere along the glacier. The name was suggested by geologist J.H. Mercer, Institute of Polar Studies, Ohio State University, following field work in the vicinity.

=== Mount Pool ===
86°13′S 127°00′W. A peak, 2,090 metres (6,860 ft) high, standing at the northwest side of Metavolcanic Mountain, at the east flank of Reedy Glacier. Named by US-ACAN for Douglas A. Pool, construction electrician at Byrd Station in 1962.

=== Gratton Nunatak ===
86°06′S 127°46′W. A bare, linear nunatak lying at the south side of the mouth of McCarthy Glacier, where the latter enters Reedy Glacier. Named by US-ACAN for John W. Gratton, construction mechanic at Byrd Station in 1962.

=== Blubaugh Nunatak ===
85°45′S 134°06′W. A ridge-like nunatak located just south of the mouth of Kansas Glacier where it enters Reedy Glacier. Named by US-ACAN for Donald D. Blubaugh, construction mechanic, Byrd Station winter party, 1957.

=== Abbey Nunatak ===
85°37′S 134°43′W. A nunatak 2 nautical miles (3.7 km; 2.3 mi) southeast of Penrod Nunatak, lying at the west side of Reedy Glacier just north of the mouth of Kansas Glacier. Mapped by USGS from surveys and USN air photos, 1960-64. Named by US-ACAN for Gordon Abbey, radioman with the Byrd Station winter party, 1957.

=== Penrod Nunatak ===
85°35′S 134°53′W. A nunatak 2 nautical miles (3.7 km; 2.3 mi) northwest of Abbey Nunatak, lying at the west side of Reedy Glacier just north of the mouth of Kansas Glacier. Named by US-ACAN for Jack R. Penrod, builder with the Byrd Station winter party, 1957.

=== Langford Peak ===
85°33′S 135°23′W. An isolated peak 2 nautical miles (3.7 km; 2.3 mi) west of the lower part of Reedy Glacier and 5 nautical miles (9.3 km; 5.8 mi) northwest of Abbey Nunatak. Named by US-ACAN for Lawrence G. Langford, Jr., a builder with the Byrd Station winter party, 1958.

=== Racine Nunatak ===
85°28′S 136°18′W. Nunatak, 960 metres (3,150 ft), located 3 nautical miles (5.6 km; 3.5 mi) west of the lower part of Reedy Glacier and 7 nautical miles (13 km; 8.1 mi) ESE of Berry Peaks. Named by US-ACAN for Edward J. Racine, a member of the crew of the icebreaker Eastwind in Operation Deep Freeze 1967.

=== Cohen Nunatak ===
85°24′S 136°12′W. A nunatak lying 1 nautical mile (1.9 km; 1.2 mi) west of the lower part of Reedy Glacier and 7 nautical miles (13 km; 8.1 mi) east of Berry Peaks. Named by US-ACAN for Lt. (jg) Harvey A. Cohen, USNR, public affairs officer on the staff of the Commander, U.S. Naval Support Force, Antarctica, in Operation Deep Freeze 1966 and 1967.

== Sources ==
- Alberts, Fred G., ed. (1995), Geographic Names of the Antarctic (PDF) (2 ed.), United States Board on Geographic Names This article incorporates public domain material from websites or documents of the United States Board on Geographic Names.
- Bromley, Gordon R.M. (2005), Reconstructing the History of Reedy Glacier, Antarctica, University of Maine
- Bromley, Gordon R. M.; Hall, Brenda L.; Stone, John O.; Conway, Howard; Todd, Claire E. (February 2010), "Late Cenozoic deposits at Reedy Glacier, Transantarctic Mountains: implications for former thickness of the West Antarctic Ice Sheet", Quaternary Science Reviews, 29 (3–4): 384–398, doi:10.1016/j.quascirev.2009.07.001, hdl:10379/14780
- Caloplaca Hills, USGS: United States Geological Survey
- Leverett Glacier, USGS: United States Geological Survey
- Todd, Claire E. (2007), Late Quaternary Evolution of Reedy Glacier, Antarctica (PDF) (thesis), University of Washington
- Wisconsin Range, USGS: United States Geological Survey
- This article incorporates public domain material from websites or documents of the United States Geological Survey.
