= John H. Mercer =

Ohio State University glaciologist

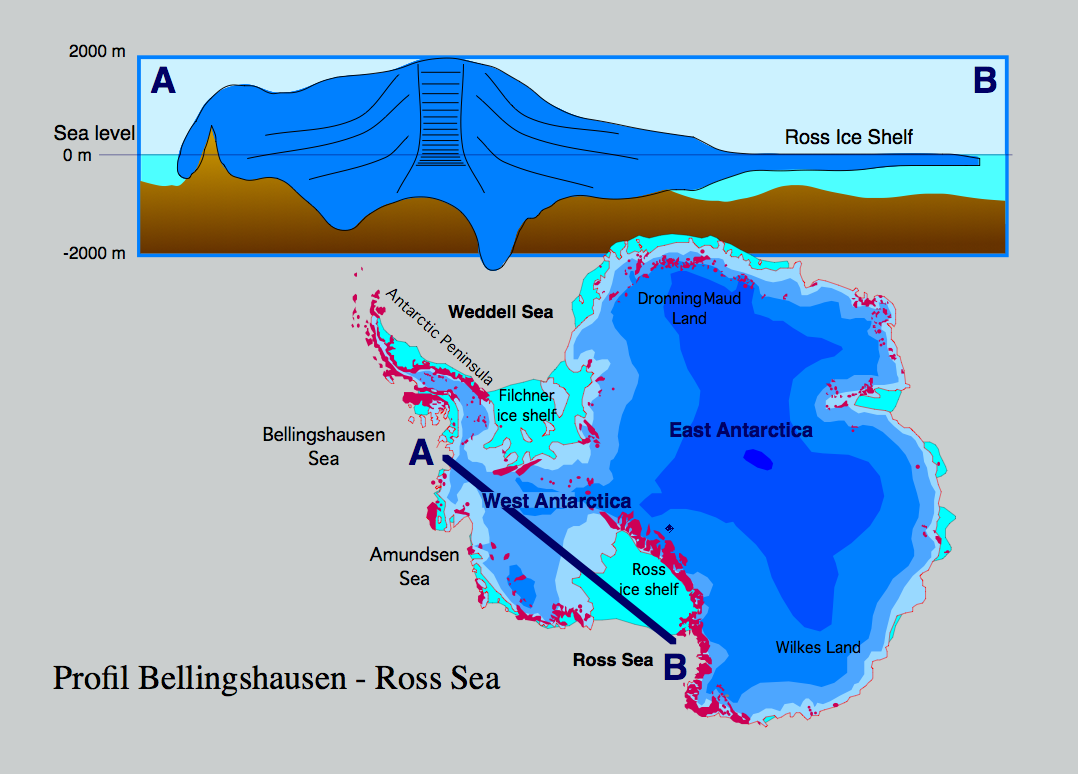
Profile showing that most of the West Antarctic ice sheet is grounded below sea level which makes it sensitive to sea level rise. If contact of ice to bottom rocks is lost seaward of the grounding line, the ice sheet becomes significantly thinner (some 100 m), forming a shelf ice.

John H. Mercer (19 October 1922 – 3 July 1987) was a British glaciologist, chiefly known for his theoretical work on, and field studies of Antarctic ice streams, especially in the Transantarctic Mountains and in West Antarctica. Following John T. Hollin's work (1962) suggesting that climatic warming and rising sea-level cause Antarctic ice shelves to retreat, Mercer postulated that the West Antarctic ice sheet, being grounded well below sea-level and terminating in floating ice shelves, was vulnerable to these changes and may have collapsed altogether during the last interglacial when Antarctica may have been warmer and sea-level may have been higher. In 1978, in the science magazine Nature, Mercer pointed out that "green-house" warming from burning fossil fuel could have the same effect during the present interglacial. Two studies published 12 May 2014 confirm Mercer's assumption.

Climate scientist James Hansen has coined the term, "John Mercer effect." After Mercer published his paper suggesting that the West Antarctic ice sheet could collapse in response to warming, he struggled to get funding. Others, including Hansen, had similar problems. Many climate scientists censor their own work to avoid losing funding, especially regarding prospects for limiting warming to 2 °C above pre-industrial temperatures.

John H. Mercer was born in Cheltenham, England in 1922, the third child of Harriet and John W. Mercer. He was educated at private schools in Cheltenham and, later, at Gordonstoun in Scotland. During World War II he served in the British Merchant Marines (1940–46) as a radio man. After the war he went to University of Cambridge and studied geography. At that time he came under the influence of William Vaughan Lewis. After finishing his B.A. in 1949 Mercer went to Canada, where he received his PhD in geography from McGill University in 1954. He was a Research Scholar from 1954 to 1956 at the Australian National University in Canberra, where he studied land use and population in western Samoa. He returned to Canada and worked in the Canadian Hydro-graphic Office in Ottawa as a geographer in 1957 and 1958. During 1959–60, 1961–62, 1964, and 1966, the American Geographical Society employed him at its World Data Center A for Glaciology in New York. The turning point in his career as a glaciologist was in 1960, when he became a research associate at The Ohio State University, in the Institute of Polar Studies (renamed the Byrd Polar Research Center). He remained at The Ohio State University until his death, becoming its first senior research scientist.

Mercer died in Columbus, Ohio in 1987.

== Legacy ==
- Mercer Ridge in Antarctica is named for him

== Bibliography ==
- Southern Hemisphere Glacier Atlas (1967)
- Glacier Resurgence at the Atlantic/sub-Boreal Transition (1967)
- Antarctic Ice and Sangamon Sea Level (1968)
- Holocene Glacier Variations in Southern South America (1982)
- Cenozoic Glaciation in the Southern Hemisphere (1983)
