= Watson Escarpment =

Escarpment in the Queen Maud Mountains, Antarctica

- Location within Antarctica

Geography
- Continent: Antarctica
- Range coordinates: 86°0′S 145°0′W
- Parent range: Queen Maud Mountains

Watson Escarpment (86°0′S 145°0′W) is a major escarpment in the Queen Maud Mountains, trending northward along the east margin of Scott Glacier, then eastward to Reedy Glacier where it turns southward along the glacier's west side. Somewhat arcuate, the escarpment is nearly 100 nautical miles (190 km; 120 mi) long, rises 3,550 metres (11,650 ft) above sea level, and 1,000 to 1,500 metres (3,300 to 4,900 ft) above the adjacent terrain.

== Discovery and naming ==
The north-central part of the escarpment was observed from a vantage point on Supporting Party Mountain and was partially mapped in December 1929 by the Byrd Antarctic Expedition geological party under Laurence Gould. The escarpment was more closely observed in December 1934 by the Byrd Antarctic Expedition geological party under Quin Blackburn, and was named by Byrd for Thomas J. Watson, American business executive, a patron of this expedition. The escarpment and its related features was mapped in detail by United States Geological Survey (USGS) from surveys and United States Navy air photos, 1960–64.

== Topology ==
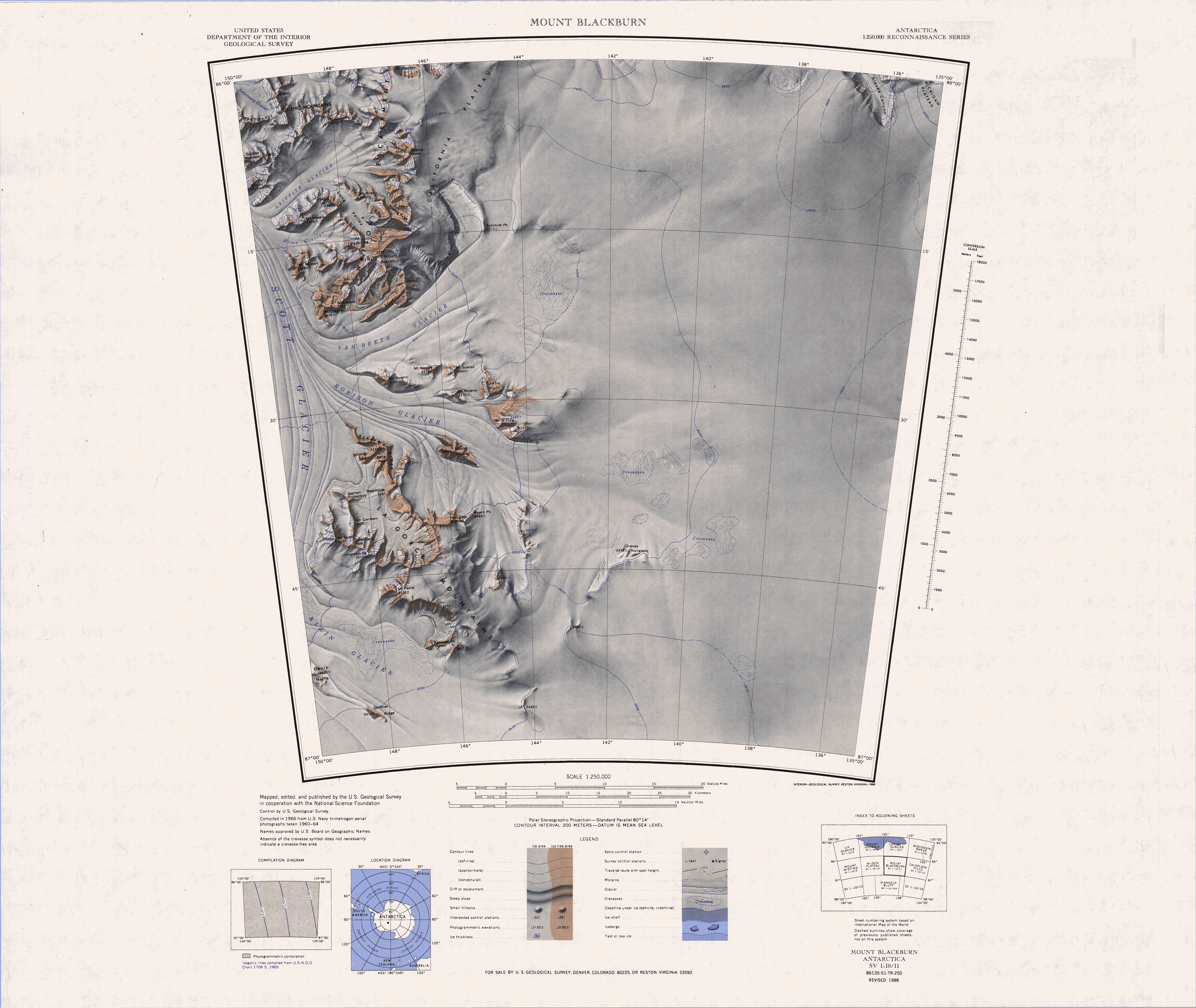
Western end of Watson Escarpment in northwest of map

The western end of the Watson Escarpment is a massif to the northeast of the point where the Van Reeth Glacier joins the Scott Glacier. The tip of the massif holds Mount Czegka, Acarospora Peak and Dunn Spur. To the north are Mount Russell, Mount Blackburn and Parker Bluff. To the north of Mount Blackburn the Long Valley leads to the head of Griffith Glacier, which is separated from Howe Glacier by Mount Meeks and Skilift Col. Mount Riley and Roaring Ridge are east of Long Valley.

The Watson Escarpment continues east along the rim of the California Plateau past Beacon Dome and Mount Warden. It continues below Maaske Dome and above Evans Butte. To the east of Mount Beazley there is a gap in the escarpment through which the Leverett Glacier flows north towards the Ross Ice Shelf. The escarpment continues east past McLean Peak along the north rim of Stanford Plateau. It passes Phleger Dome and Mount Doumani along the upper reaches of the Kansas Glacier, and passes Foreman Peak and Dzema Peak to the north of Johns Glacier. At its eastern end it passes Cole Peak to its south, and includes Mount Ratliff and Mount O'Neill.

Most of the features along the escarpment were mapped by the United States Geological Survey (USGS) from ground surveys and United States Navy air photos between 1960 and 1964.

== Western massif features ==
=== Mount Czegka ===
86°21′S 148°41′W. A mountain, 2,270 metres (7,450 ft) high, on the east side of Scott Glacier, just north of the terminus of Van Reeth Glacier. Discovered in December 1934 by the ByrdAE geological party under Quin Blackburn. Named by Byrd after Victor H. Czegka (1880-1973), CWO, USMC, who served as a member with the ByrdAE, 1928-30, and also as member and supply manager with the ByrdAE, 1933-35.

=== Acarospora Peak ===
86°21′S 148°28′W. A peak 1 nautical mile (1.9 km; 1.2 mi) northeast of, and only slightly below the elevation of Mount Czegka, located at the southwest end of Watson Escarpment. Named by New Zealand Antarctic Place Names Committee (NZ-APC) on suggestion of [[New Zealand Geological Survey Antarctic Expedition]] (NZGSAE) Scott Glacier Party, 1969-70, because the lichen Acarospora emergens Dodge was found on the peak.

=== Dunn Spur ===
86°21′S 147°22′W. A prominent rock spur which descends from Mount Blackburn and extends for 5 nautical miles (9.3 km; 5.8 mi) along the north side of Van Reeth Glacier. Named by the United States Advisory Committee on Antarctic Names (US-ACAN) for Thomas H. Dunn of United States Navy Squadron VX-6, aircrewman on photographic

=== Mount Russell ===
86°17′S 149°08′W. A mountain, 2,280 metres (7,480 ft) high, standing on the east flank of Scott Glacier just south of the mouth of Howe Glacier. Discovered in December 1934 by the geological party of the ByrdAE, 1933-35, and named for Richard S. Russell, Jr., one of the members of that party, and his father, Richard S. Russell, Sr., a supporter of the Byrd Antarctic expeditions.

=== Mount Blackburn ===
86°17′S 147°16′W. A massive, flat-topped mountain, 3,275 metres (10,745 ft) high, standing just east of Scott Glacier where it surmounts the southwest end of California Plateau and the Watson Escarpment. Discovered by and named for Quin A. Blackburn, geologist, leader of the ByrdAE geological party which sledged the length of Scott Glacier in December 1934.

=== Parker Bluff ===
86°17′S 145°38′W. A bold, rounded bluff at the south end of the California Plateau, overlooking Van Reeth Glacier about 5 nautical miles (9.3 km; 5.8 mi) east of Mount Blackburn. Named by US-ACAN for John J. Parker, photographer with United States Navy Squadron VX-6 on Operation Deep Freeze 1966 and 1967.

=== Schmidt Peak ===
86°15′S 144°50′W. A peak along the south side of California Plateau, marking the end of a narrow ridge 3 nautical miles (5.6 km; 3.5 mi) northeast of Parker Bluff. Named by US-ACAN for Dennis C. Schmidt, photographer with United States Navy Squadron VX-6 on Operation Deep Freeze 1963, 1964 and 1967.

=== Long Valley ===
86°13′S 147°48′W. An ice-filled valley, 6 nautical miles (11 km; 6.9 mi) long, extending from Mount Blackburn northwestward to Griffith Glacier. Named by US-ACAN for Walter H. Long, Jr., of United States Navy Squadron VX-6, photographer on Operation Deep Freeze 1966 and 1967.

=== Mount Meeks ===
86°13′S 148°51′W. A mountain, 2,470 metres (8,100 ft) high, surmounting the rocky divide between Griffith Glacier and Howe Glacier. Named by US-ACAN for Lt. Harman T. Meeks of United States Navy Squadron VX-6, navigator on aircraft during Operation Deep Freeze 1966 and 1967.

=== Skilift Col ===
86°11′S 148°36′W. A col in the mountain wall between the Griffith Glacier and Howe Glacier, on the west side of Watson Escarpment. The col is 2 nautical miles (3.7 km; 2.3 mi) northeast of Mount Meeks and provides a shortcut to field parties. So named by NZGSAE, 1969-70, because some members of the party used a motor toboggan here in a similar way to a ski-lift.

=== Mount Riley ===
86°11′S 147°37′W. A mountain, 2,100 metres (6,900 ft) high, standing along the northeast side of Long Valley, just west of California Plateau. Named by US-ACAN for Lt. (j.g.) Stephen G. Riley, photographic officer with United States Navy Squadron VX-6 on Operation Deep Freeze 1966 and 1967.

=== Roaring Ridge ===
86°14′S 146°45′W. A long and outstanding spur that descends from the Watson Escarpment 3.5 nautical miles (6.5 km; 4.0 mi) northeast of Mount Blackburn. So named by NZGSAE (1969-70) because two geologists worked and camped nearby, experiencing roaring gale force winds rushing down the steep escarpment.

== Central escarpment features ==
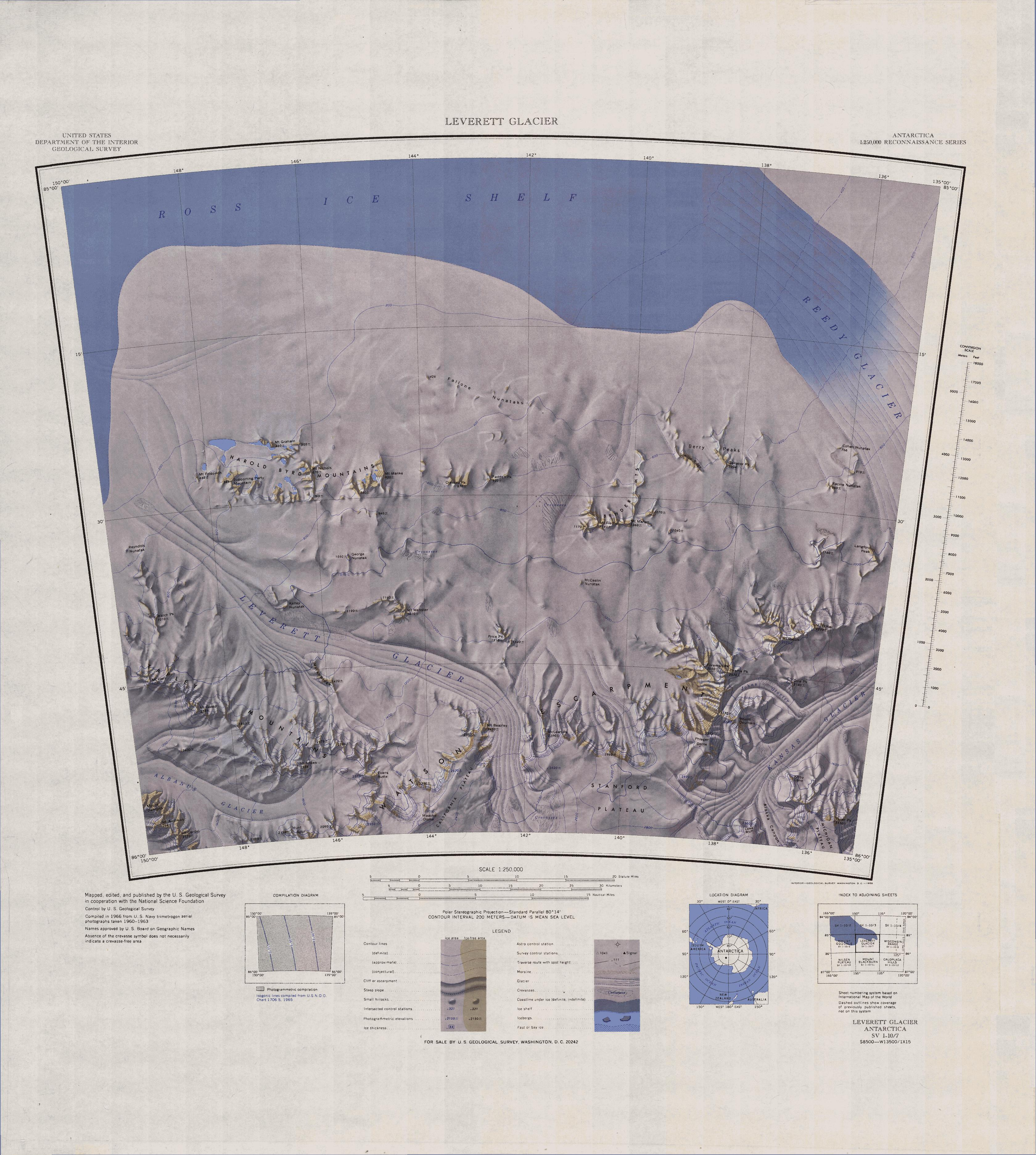
Watson Escarpment extends across south of map

Features along the central escarpment, from west to east, are:

=== California Plateau ===
86°04′S 145°10′W. An undulating ice-covered plateau, 30 nautical miles (56 km; 35 mi) long and from 2 to 12 nautical miles (3.7 to 22.2 km; 2.3 to 13.8 mi) wide, which rises to 3,000 metres (9,800 ft) high at the eastern side of Scott Glacier. The plateau reaches a maximum height in Mount Blackburn, 3,275 metres (10,745 ft) high, at the southern end. The northwestern side of the plateau is marked by the steep rock cliffs of Watson Escarpment; the southeastern side grades gradually to the elevation of the interior ice. Named by US-ACAN for the several branches of the University of California which have sent numerous researchers to work in Antarctica.

=== Beacon Dome ===
86°08′S 146°25′W. A large dome-like mountain, 3,010 metres (9,880 ft) high, standing at the head of Griffith Glacier along the Watson Escarpment. So named by NZGSAE (1969-70) because the mountain is composed of a granite basement with horizontally layered rocks of the Beacon series above.

=== Mount Warden ===
86°00′S 146°37′W. A snow-covered peak, 2,860 metres (9,380 ft) high, standing close southeast of Hunt Spur and surmounting a projecting buttress at the northwest face of Watson Escarpment. Named by US-ACAN for Lt. George W. Warden, United States Navy, pilot on aircraft flights over the Queen Maud Mountains in United States Navy Operation Highjump, 1946-47.

=== Hunt Spur ===
85°59′S 146°50′W. A rugged spur descending from Mount Warden along the northwest face of Watson Escarpment. Named by US-ACAN for Glenn C. Hunt, aviation electronics technician of United States Navy Squadron VX-6 who participated in Operation Deep Freeze for 5 years.

=== Maaske Dome ===
85°58′S 144°00′W. An icecapped, dome-like elevation 2 nautical miles (3.7 km; 2.3 mi) long, rising above the north part of California Plateau. Named by US-ACAN for Lt. Gary L. Maaske, United States Navy, helicopter pilot at McMurdo Station, 1962-63 and 1963-64 seasons.

=== Mount Beazley ===
85°51′S 142°51′W. Mountain, 2,410 metres (7,910 ft) high, surmounting the north extremity of the California Plateau. Named by US-ACAN for Lt. Robert M. Beazley, MC, United States Navy, officer in charge of the South Pole Station winter party, 1965.

=== McLean Peak ===
85°51′S 141°35′W. A peak, 2,290 metres (7,510 ft) high, surmounting a spur descending from the northwest end of Stanford Plateau, along the Watson Escarpment. Named by US-ACAN for Lt. William E. McLean, United States Navy, medical officer and officer in charge of the South Pole Station winter party in 1964.

=== Stanford Plateau ===
85°57′S 140°00′W. An icecapped plateau, over 3,000 metres (9,800 ft) high and 15 nautical miles (28 km; 17 mi) wide, between the heads of Leverett and Kansas Glaciers. The plateau unites with the interior ice sheet to the S, but terminates to the north in the Watson Escarpment. Named by US-ACAN for Stanford University which has sent a number of researchers to study Antarctica.

=== Phleger Dome ===
85°52′S 138°24′W. A massive dome-shaped mountain, 3,315 metres (10,876 ft) high, at the northeast end of Stanford Plateau along the Watson Escarpment. Named by US-ACAN for Herman Phleger, one of the United States representatives in the discussions on the Antarctic Treaty of 1959.

=== Lowe Bluff ===
85°58′S 137°12′W. A high, ice-covered bluff between the head of Kansas Glacier and Alaska Canyon, along the Watson Escarpment. Named by US-ACAN for William G. Lowe, radioman with the Byrd Station winter party, 1957.

=== Mount Analogue ===
85°49′S 138°05′W. A prominent mountain along the Watson Escarpment, rising to 3,170 metres (10,400 ft) high and forming the highest point of the ridge that runs north from Phleger Dome, Stanford Plateau. The feature was visited in 1977-78 by a USARP-Arizona State University geological party, led by Edmund Stump, and named after Mount Analogue, a mythical mountain obscured by clouds, as described in the unfinished novel Mount Analogue by Réné Dumal. This mountain was obscured by clouds during much of the visit by the USARP party.

=== Mount Doumani ===
85°49′S 137°38′W. Prominent mountain, 3,240 metres (10,630 ft) high, standing between Johns and Kansas Glaciers at the north side of Watson Escarpment. Named by US-ACAN for George A. Doumani, geologist with the Byrd Station winter party in 1959. Doumani explored the Horlick Mountains area that year and in 1960-61, 1961-62 and 1964-65. He visited the Mount Weaver area in 1962-63.

=== Foreman Peak ===
85°45′S 138°24′W. Peak, 2,050 metres (6,730 ft) high, standing 2 nautical miles (3.7 km; 2.3 mi) west of Dzema Peak on the north side of Watson Escarpment. Named by US-ACAN for Donald L. Foreman, mechanic with United States Navy Squadron VX-6 who wintered at Little America V in 1958 and McMurdo Station in 1960.

=== Dzema Peak ===
85°45′S 138°00′W. Peak, 2,570 metres (8,430 ft) high, standing 5 nautical miles (9.3 km; 5.8 mi) west-southwest of Mount Ratliff on the north side of Watson Escarpment. Named by US-ACAN for Lt. (jg) John Dzema of United States Navy Squadron VX-6 who was at McMurdo Station the 1962-63 and 1963-64 seasons.

=== Cole Peak ===
85°45′S 136°38′W. Peak, 2,140 metres (7,020 ft) high, located 6 nautical miles (11 km; 6.9 mi) northeast of Mount Doumani at the north side of Watson Escarpment. Named by US-ACAN for Jerry D. Cole, airman with United States Navy Squadron VX-6 at McMurdo Sound, 1957 and 1960.

=== Mount Ratliff ===
85°42′S 137°00′W. Mountain, 2,520 metres (8,270 ft) high, located north of Watson Escarpment and 8 nautical miles (15 km; 9.2 mi) NNE of Mount Doumani. Named by US-ACAN for Charles E. Ratliff, aviation machinist mate with United States Navy Squadron VX-6 in several Operation Deep Freeze deployments, 1963-67.

=== Mount O'Neil ===
85°40′S 136°20′W. Mountain, 2,090 metres (6,860 ft) high, just northeast of Mount Ratliff at the north side of Kansas Glacier. Named by US-ACAN for Robert J. O'Neil, utilitiesman with the Byrd Station winter party in 1961.

== Eastern end ==
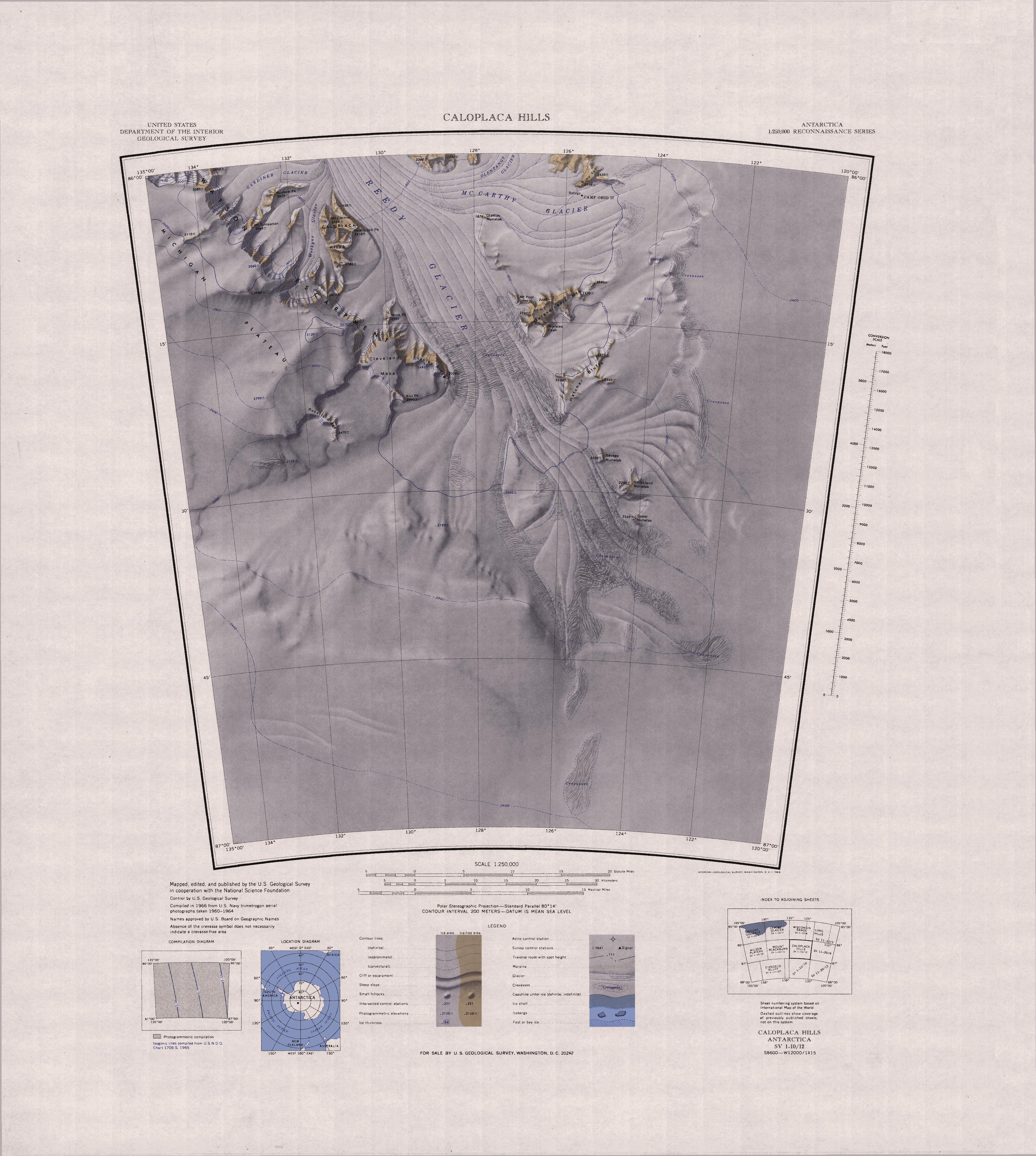
Eastern part of the escarpment to the northwest

=== Cleveland Mesa ===
86°19′S 130°00′W. A high, ice-covered mesa, 5 nautical miles (9.3 km; 5.8 mi) long and 3 nautical miles (5.6 km; 3.5 mi) wide, situated at the southeast end of Michigan Plateau. Named by US-ACAN for Harlan Cleveland, Asst. Sec. of State for International Organization Affairs, 1961-65, who was Chairman of the Antarctic Policy Group in 1965.

=== Mink Peak ===
86°14′S 129°56′W. A prominent peak standing 2 nautical miles (3.7 km; 2.3 mi) north of Cleveland Mesa, at the east end of Watson Escarpment. Named by US-ACAN for Harold D. Mink, utilitiesman with the wintering parties at Byrd Station in 1962 and 1966.

=== Shapley Ridge ===
86°18′S 129°10′W. A prominent ridge overlooking Reedy Glacier; it extends east from Cleveland Mesa and marks the east extremity of the Watson Escarpment. Named by US-ACAN for Alan H. Shapley, ViceChairman of the United States National Committee for the IGY.

=== Kivi Peak ===
86°22′S 129°39′W. A peak, 2,390 metres (7,840 ft) high, marking the south end of Cleveland mesa on the east side of Michigan Plateau. Named by US-ACAN for Stephen Kivi, utilitiesman at Byrd Station in 1962.

=== Michigan Plateau ===
86°08′S 133°30′W. An undulating ice-covered plateau, 30 nautical miles (56 km; 35 mi) long, which rises to 3,000 metres (9,800 ft) high at the western side of Reedy Glacier. The northern and eastern sides of the plateau are marked by the steep Watson Escarpment; the western and southern sides grade gradually to the elevation of the interior ice. Named by US-ACAN after the University of Michigan at Ann Arbor, Michigan, which has sent numerous research personnel to work in Antarctica.

=== Teller Peak ===
85°57′S 135°28′W. A peak, 3,550 metres (11,650 ft) high, marking the northeast extremity of Michigan Plateau and the Watson Escarpment. Mapped by USGS from surveys and United States Navy air photos, 1960-63. Named by US-AC AN for James T. Teller, geologist with the Ohio State University party to the Horlick Mountains in 1964-65.

=== Burlock Peak ===
86°03′S 132°20′W. A peak, 2,070 metres (6,790 ft) high, on the spur descending from Mount Simsarian, along the east face of Watson Escarpment. Named by US-ACAN for James U. Burlock, builder at Byrd Station in 1962.

=== Mount Simsarian ===
86°06′S 132°50′W. A large mountain projecting from the east side of Michigan Plateau just south of the head of Gardiner Glacier. Named by US-AC AN for James Simsarian Chief Division of International Scientific and Technical Affairs, Department of State.

=== Roberts Ridge ===
86°23′S 131°30′W. A prominent ridge 5 nautical miles (9.3 km; 5.8 mi) southwest of Cleveland Mesa, at the southeast end of Michigan Plateau. Mapped by USGS from surveys and USN air photos, 1960-64. Named by US-ACAN for Peter Roberts of the Division of International Scientific and Technical Affairs, Department of State.

== Sources ==
- Alberts, Fred G., ed. (1995), Geographic Names of the Antarctic (PDF) (2 ed.), United States Board on Geographic Names This article incorporates public domain material from websites or documents of the United States Board on Geographic Names.
- Leverett Glacier, USGS: United States Geological Survey
- Mount Blackburn, USGS: United States Geological Survey
- This article incorporates public domain material from websites or documents of the United States Geological Survey.
