= 1770 in Iceland =

- Decades: 1750s; 1760s; 1770s; 1780s; 1790s
- See also: Other events in 1770 · Timeline of Icelandic history

Events in the year 1770 in Iceland.

== Incumbents ==
- Monarch: Christian VII
- Governor of Iceland: Lauritz Andreas Thodal

== Events ==
- Lauritz Andreas Thodal became the governor of Iceland, taking over from Christian von Proeck
- The first National Committee begins its work and investigates the national economy of Iceland. The National Committee made recommendations on how the interests of the people of Iceland could be improved. Two of the committee members were Danish, and the third was Icelander Þorkell Jónsson Fjeldsted.
- 15 May: The country was divided into two counties: South and West Counties (Suður- og Vesturamt) and North and East Counties (Norður- og Austuramt).

== Births ==
- November 17: Marta María Stephensen, writer.
