= 1780 in Iceland =

- Decades: 1760s; 1770s; 1780s; 1790s; 1800s
- See also: Other events in 1780 · Timeline of Icelandic history

Events in the year 1780 in Iceland.

== Incumbents ==
- Monarch: Christian VII
- Governor of Iceland: Lauritz Andreas Thodal

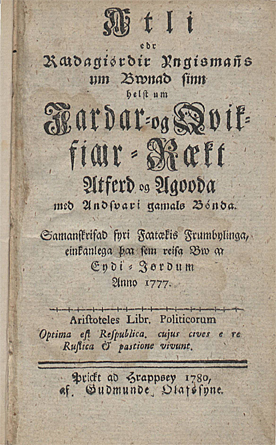
Atli was printed in the Hrappsey printing house and published there in 1780

== Events ==
- The mysterious disappearance of The Reynistadur Brothers, two young brothers from Reynistaður in Skagafjörður who perished along with three of their companions in Kjölur at the beginning of the winter.
- The book Atli by Björn Halldórsson in Sauðlauksdalur was first published.
