= 1771 in Iceland =

- Decades: 1750s; 1760s; 1770s; 1780s; 1790s
- See also: Other events in 1771 · Timeline of Icelandic history

Events in the year 1771 in Iceland.

== Incumbents ==
- Monarch: Christian VII
- Governor of Iceland: Lauritz Andreas Thodal

== Events ==
- Reindeer were first brought to Iceland from Finnmark in Norway.
- May 2: Former governor Christian von Proeck is deposed due to his reluctance to enforce royal decrees.
