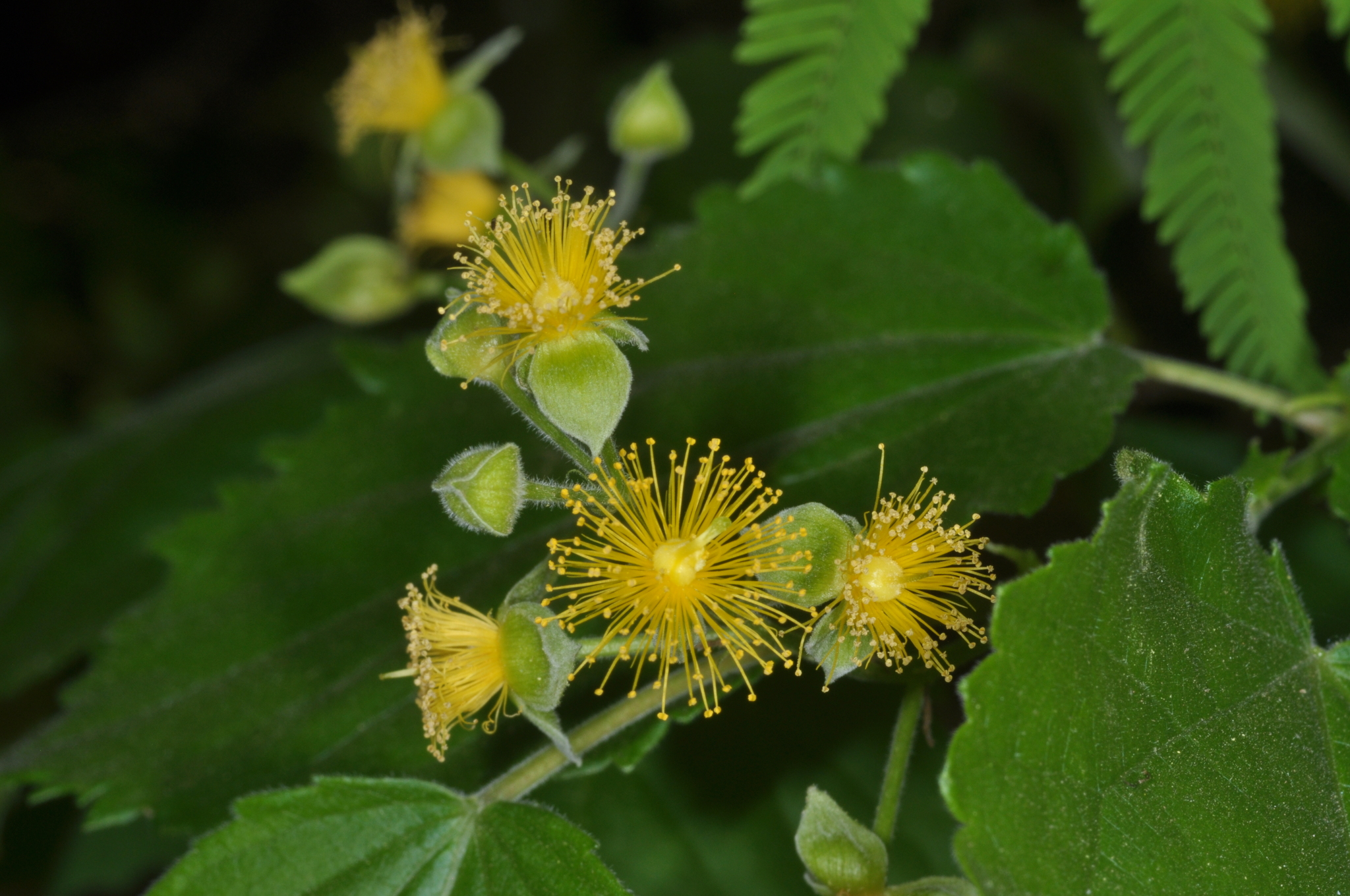
- The flowers of Prockia crucis.

Conservation status
- Least Concern (IUCN 3.1)

Scientific classification
- Kingdom: Plantae
- Clade: Tracheophytes
- Clade: Angiosperms
- Clade: Eudicots
- Clade: Rosids
- Order: Malpighiales
- Family: Salicaceae
- Genus: Prockia
- Species: P. crucis

Binomial name
- Prockia crucis P.Browne ex L.

Synonyms
- List: Kellettia odorata Seem.; Prockia acuta DC.; Prockia bahiensis Turcz.; Prockia completa Hook.; Prockia crucifolia Müll.Berol.; Prockia crucis var. cordata DC.; Prockia crucis var. septemnervia (Spreng.) Sleumer; Prockia glabra Briq.; Prockia grandiflora Herzog; Prockia hassleri Briq.; Prockia lobata Poir.; Prockia lutea (L.) Gilg; Prockia macrostachya DC.; Prockia mexicana Turcz.; Prockia morifolia Triana & Planch.; Prockia septemnervia Spreng.; Prockia subcordata DC.; Prockia tomentosa A.Rich.; Prockia villosa Moric.; Tinea triplinervia Spreng.; Trilix auriculata Ruiz & Pav.; Trilix crucis (P.Browne ex L.) Griseb.; Trilix lutea L.

= Prockia crucis =

Guasimilla

Species of flowering plant

Prockia crucis, commonly known as guasimilla, is a species of flowering plant in the family Salicaceae, distributed across the Americas. As the type species of its genus, it was first named by Carl Linnaeus in 1759, but described by Patrick Browne earlier. The plant is used in medicine, food, and gardening, with a conservation status of least concern on the IUCN Red List.

== Description ==
Prockia crucis is a variable shrub or tree usually 1.2–10 m (3 ft 11 in – 32 ft 10 in) tall, occasionally reaching up to 20 m (66 ft). It is characterized by a globose crown supported by a crooked trunk that is up to 25 cm (9.8 in) wide, with grey or brown bark that is either glabrous or puberulous; the wood within is white, coarse, and quite brittle, reportedly having a density of 0.58 g/cm^{3} (0.052 oz/in^{3}). The leaves are alternate, measuring up to 15 cm (5.9 in) long and 11 cm (4.3 in) wide; the shape is commonly elliptic, lanceolate, or ovate, the apex is acuminate, the base is often rounded or cordate, and the margins are frequently serrate or crenate. The leaf surface is either chartaceous or membranaceous, and the veins come in pairs that form an obscure reticulate pattern; the petiole is short, measuring up to 3 cm (1.2 in) long.

The inflorescences are usually racemose, paniculate, or corymbose, measure up to 4 cm (1.6 in) long and 3 cm (1.2 in) wide, and contain up to 12 hermaphroditic flowers that are green or yellow in color. The stamens are yellow, numerous, and feature filaments that are up to 6 mm (0.24 in) long. The ovary is superior, either globose or ovoid in shape, and may be glabrous or puberulous; it bears a style that measures up to 4 mm (0.16 in) long, tipped by a lobed stigma. The fruit is a globose berry or drupe measuring up to 10 mm (0.39 in) in diameter; they begin green and mature to red, purple, or black, featuring a thin pericarp and a reportedly juicy pulp. The seeds are light brown or black, smooth, striate, and small in size, measuring roughly 1.5 mm (0.059 in) long and 1 mm (0.039 in) wide.

== Distribution and habitat ==
Prockia crucis has a very broad distribution, spanning from Mexico to Argentina and encompassing an array of regions. In Mexico, it is found in several states, including Oaxaca, Chiapas, and Veracruz. Its range extends through Central America and into northern and western South America, with occurrences in Colombia, Venezuela, Ecuador, Paraguay, Peru, and Bolivia. In Brazil, the species is widespread, from Acre in the north to Paraná and Santa Catarina in the south, continuing into Uruguay and northern Argentina. Additionally, it is present on numerous Caribbean islands, such as Cuba, Puerto Rico, Hispaniola, and the Virgin Islands.

Due to its large extent, Prockia crucis inhabits a decent variety of tropical and subtropical environments, present at elevations of up to 2,500 m (8,200 ft). It thrives in many forest habitats, most notably those dominated by Quercus or Araucaria, as well as gallery forests, semi-evergreen forests, and tropical rainforests. In addition to forests, Prockia crucis occurs in thorny thickets, shrublands, grasslands, and floodplains. Although seen typically growing in serpentine soil, it has been recorded on limestone.

== Ecology ==
Prockia crucis grows best in dappled shade, showing a moderate growth rate when young; preferring moist soil, it can tolerate seasonal flooding. The plant is known to be consumed by a few bird species, including the rufous-bellied thrush, white-browed brushfinch, tropical parula, slaty elaenia, and dot-fronted woodpecker; its fruits specifically are appreciated by native fauna. Prockia crucis is also the host of Condylorrhiza vestigialis, a species of moth.

== Taxonomy ==
Prockia crucis was first named by Carl Linnaeus in 1759, but described by Patrick Browne earlier; it serves as the type species of its genus. The family that Prockia and this species were placed into was initially ambiguous, either being grouped into Flacourtiaceae under the Cronquist system or Tiliaceae under the Bentham & Hooker system. Later on, these families became defunct because of the APG IV and APG systems respectively, resulting in Prockia being classified under Salicaceae according to modern systems; despite these taxonomic changes, the tribe Prockia is within, Prockieae, has remained with the genus and has not been absent in any of its classifications.

=== Etymology ===
The generic name Prockia is in honor of Christian Leberecht von Prøck, a Danish baron. The specific epithet, crucis, is the genitive singular form of the Latin crux, which means "cross". The word crucis is used to indicate possession or relationship, therefore translating to "of the cross"; it is unclear why this epithet was chosen.

== Common names ==
Aside from the name guasimilla in English, Prockia crucis goes by several common names, especially in Portuguese; these names reportedly include cuiteleiro, guaçatunga-coração, guaiapá-manso, and marmeladinha.

== Uses ==
Prockia crucis shows notable medicinal potential through its ethanol leaf and bark extracts, which exhibit strong antioxidant activity and acetylcholinesterase inhibition, indicating relevance for Alzheimer’s treatment. HPLC analysis revealed key phenolics such as gallic acid, luteolin, kaempferol, and coumarin. Though direct antifungal effects were limited, the extracts enhanced fluconazole efficacy against resistant Candida tropicalis, highlighting their role as antifungal modulators. Outside of testing, the leaves are said to have medicinal qualities, although they are not specified.

The plant is consumed for food, but the edibility of its fruits is rather dubious; however, several species within Salicaceae produce fruits that are safe to eat, indicating that the fruits of Prockia crucis may be consumable.

The exact uses of Prockia crucis in gardening are not given, but it is grown in nurseries, and is capable of being sown; it is best to do so when it ripens, where it must be done in a partially shaded nursery seedbed. The seeds must be gently sown on the soil surface due to their small size; a low germination rate is typical, with sprouting occurring within 40–60 days.

== Conservation status ==
Prockia crucis boasts a large and stable population; it is not experiencing any known threats, and is present in many protected areas, additionally having ex-situ locations. As a result of these factors, the species has a conservation status of least concern on the IUCN Red List.
