= 1773 in Iceland =

- Decades: 1750s; 1760s; 1770s; 1780s; 1790s
- See also: Other events in 1773 · Timeline of Icelandic history

Events in the year 1773 in Iceland.

== Incumbents ==
- Monarch: Christian VII
- Governor of Iceland: Lauritz Andreas Thodal

== Events ==
- The Printing house on Hrappsey begins printing, notably being the first printing house to print solely secular writings.

== Deaths ==
- Bjarni Halldórsson, theologian.
