= 1794 in Iceland =

- Decades: 1770s; 1780s; 1790s; 1800s; 1810s
- See also: Other events in 1794 · Timeline of Icelandic history

Events in the year 1794 in Iceland.

== Incumbents ==
- Monarch: Christian VII
- Governor of Iceland: Ólafur Stefánsson

== Events ==
- The Icelandic National Educational Association was founded on the initiative of Magnús Stephensen.
- The printing press on Hrappsey ceased operations.
- August 11 – Sveinn Pálsson and two of his companions climb Öræfajökull glacier for the first time.
