= 1775 in Iceland =

- Decades: 1750s; 1760s; 1770s; 1780s; 1790s
- See also: Other events in 1775 · Timeline of Icelandic history

Events in the year 1775 in Iceland.

== Incumbents ==
- Monarch: Christian VII
- Governor of Iceland: Lauritz Andreas Thodal

== Events ==
- Magnús Ketilsson publishes an article in the magazine Islandske Maanedestidende and encouraged Icelanders to make use of slaughter products from horses.
