= Reykholt =

Reykholt may refer to the following places in Iceland:

- Reykholt, Southern Iceland, village on the Golden Circle
- Reykholt, Western Iceland, home of Snorri Sturluson
