= Stenoma byssina =

Scientific classification
- Kingdom: Animalia
- Phylum: Arthropoda
- Clade: Pancrustacea
- Class: Insecta
- Order: Lepidoptera
- Family: Depressariidae
- Genus: Stenoma
- Species: S. byssina

Binomial name
- Stenoma byssina (Zeller, 1855)

Synonyms
- Cryptolechia byssina Zeller, 1855; Cryptolechia tetragonella Walker, 1864; Cryptolechia isabella Felder & Rogenhofer, 1875

Species of moth

Stenoma byssina is a moth of the family Depressariidae. It is found in Brazil (Amazonas), Venezuela, French Guiana, Guyana, Trinidad and Paraguay.

The wingspan is 20–30 mm. The forewings are pale green with a faint grey dot at the end of the cell and two triangular fuscous spots on the costa, one at midpoint and one at the apical three-fourths. From the latter extends an outwardly curved transverse line of grey spots to the dorsum before the tornus. The dorsum is edged with grey and there is a grey spot in the fold surrounded with irregular grey suffusion. The hindwings are pale yellow, more or less heavily overcast with grey in the anal area.

The larvae feed on the foliage of Melicocca bijuga.
