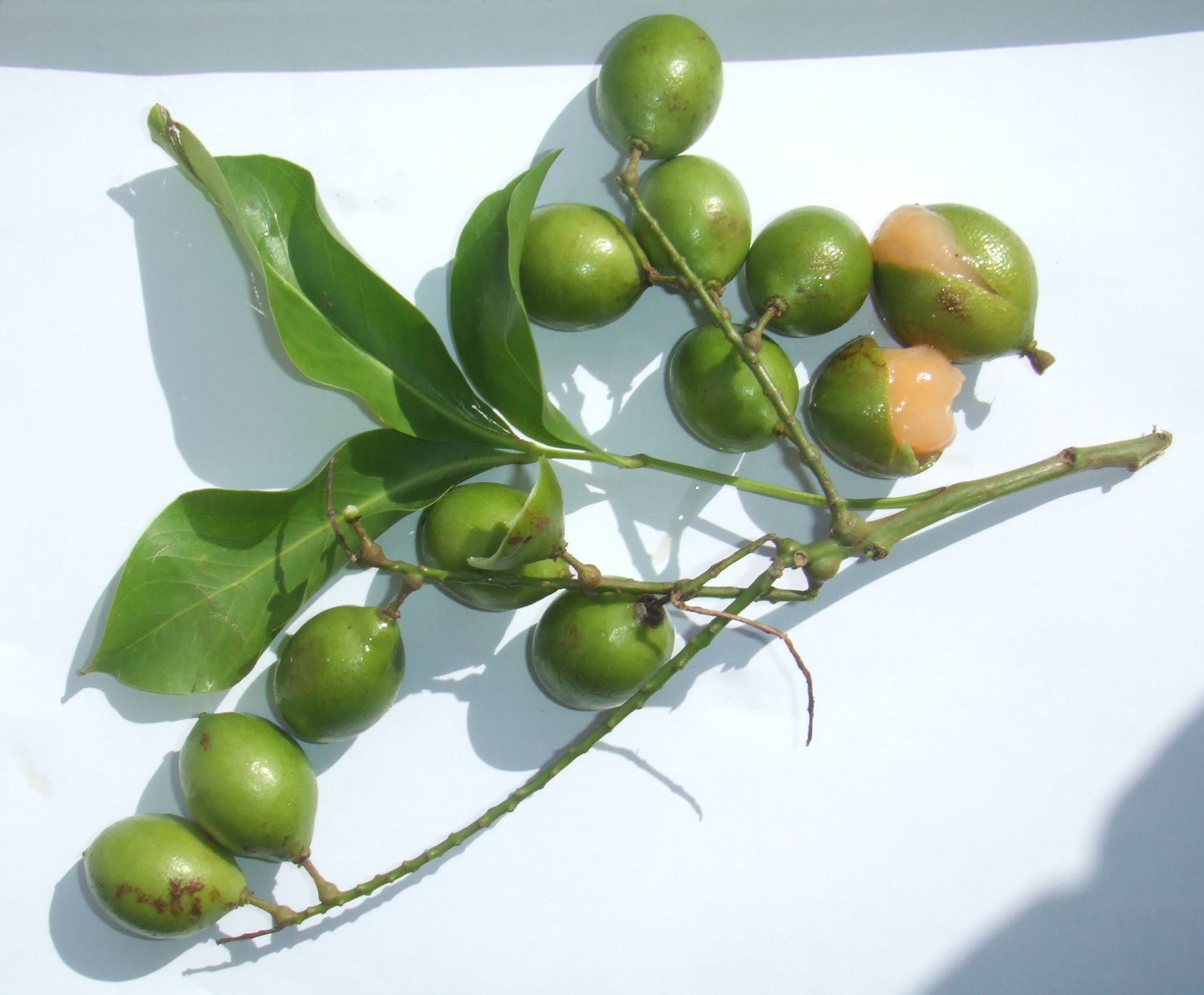
- Melicoccus bijugatus fruit

Scientific classification
- Kingdom: Plantae
- Clade: Embryophytes
- Clade: Tracheophytes
- Clade: Spermatophytes
- Clade: Angiosperms
- Clade: Eudicots
- Clade: Rosids
- Order: Sapindales
- Family: Sapindaceae
- Subfamily: Sapindoideae
- Genus: Melicoccus; P.Browne

Species
- See text

= Melicoccus =

Genus of flowering plants

Melicoccus is a genus of ten species of flowering plants in the family Sapindaceae, native to tropical regions of northern and western South America.

They are evergreen trees growing to 30 metres (98 ft) tall, with alternate pinnate leaves with 4 or 6 opposite leaflets (no terminal leaflet). The fruit is a drupe. Several species, but principally M. bijugatus, are widely cultivated in their native areas and elsewhere in Central America and the Caribbean for their fruit.

Some species of the related genus Talisia are sometimes included in Melicoccus.

Species

- Melicoccus antioquensis Acevedo-Rodríguez — Colombia
- Melicoccus aymardii Acevedo-Rodríguez — Venezuela
- Melicoccus bijugatus Jacq. – mamoncillo (Colombia, Venezuela)
- Melicoccus espritosantensis Acevedo-Rodríguez — eastern Brazil
- Melicoccus jimenezii (Alain) Acevedo-Rodríguez — Dominican Republic
- Melicoccus lepidopetalus Radlk. – motoyoé or yva povo (Bolivia, Brazil, Paraguay), Argentina
- Melicoccus novogranatensis Acevedo-Rodríguez — Colombia and Ecuador
- Melicoccus oliviformis HBK — Mexico, Central and South America and Trinidad
- Melicoccus pedicellaris (Sagot ex Radlk.) Acevedo-Rodríguez Suriname, French Guiana and Brazil
- Melicoccus petiolutatus Acevedo-Rodríguez — Peru

== Taxonomy ==
The genus Melicoccus was first described by Patrick Browne, an Irish doctor and botanist, in 1756. This description was based on M. bijugatus trees which were cultivated in Jamaica. In 1760, Nikolaus Joseph von Jacquin described the first species in Browne's genus, which he named M. bijugatus. In 1762 Linnaeus used a spelling variation of the name Melicocca bijuga. Over the next two centuries, Linnaeus' spelling variation was used in almost all publications. A proposal was made in 1994 to conserve Melicocca over Melicoccus, but the proposal was rejected, leading to a restoration of the original version of the name.

In 1888 German taxonomist Ludwig Radlkofer placed Melicoccus in the tribe Melicocceae together with eight other genera. In his monograph on the Neotropical members of the tribe (Talisia and Melicoccus) Pedro Acevedo-Rodríguez suggested that although Talisia and Melicoccus appeared to form a monophyletic group, the other (Old World) genera probably did not belong to the same lineage.
