= 1797 in Iceland =

- Decades: 1770s; 1780s; 1790s; 1800s; 1810s
- See also: Other events in 1797 · Timeline of Icelandic history

Events in the year 1797 in Iceland.

== Incumbents ==
- Monarch: Christian VII
- Governor of Iceland: Ólafur Stefánsson

== Events ==
- April: A volcanic eruption occurs at Grímsvötn.
- 30 July: Geir Vídalín is consecrated bishop of Skálholt at Hólar by Bishop Sigurður Stefánsson.
- 21 August: Sveinn Pálsson climbs Hekla for the second time.
