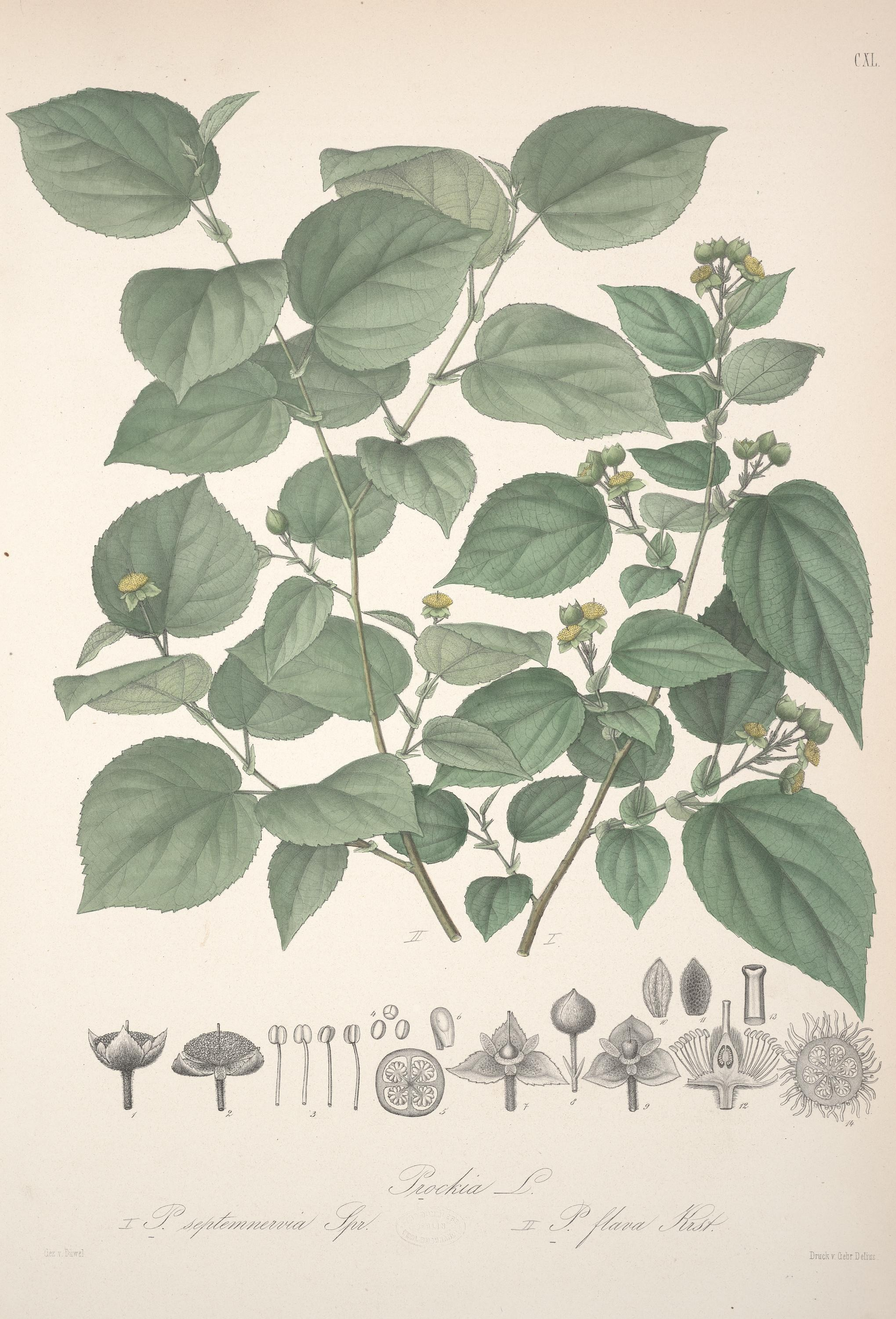

Scientific classification
- Kingdom: Plantae
- Clade: Tracheophytes
- Clade: Angiosperms
- Clade: Eudicots
- Clade: Rosids
- Order: Malpighiales
- Family: Salicaceae
- Subfamily: Salicoideae
- Tribe: Prockieae
- Genus: Prockia; P.Browne ex L.

Type species
- Prockia crucis P.Browne ex L.

Species
- 7; see text

Synonyms
- Kellettia Seem.; Tinea Spreng.; Trilix L.

= Prockia =

Genus of plants

Prockia is a genus of flowering plants in the family Salicaceae. It consists of approximately six species of shrubs and small trees native to the West Indies, Mexico, Central America, and South America. Its type species, Prockia crucis, is highly polymorphic and has a broad distribution, from Mexico and the West Indies to Uruguay and northern Argentina.

The genus name of Prockia is in honour of Christian Leberecht von Prøck (1718–1780), a Danish baron. He served as Governor-General of the Danish West Indies colonies from 1756 to 1766. It was first described and published in Syst. Nat. edition.10, Vol.2 on page 1074 in 1759.

Historically, Prockia was characterized by having pseudo-axile placentation (i.e., parietal placentae that intrude into the center of the ovary and eventually fuse, appearing axile) and 3-merous flowers and lacking nectaries. However, discoveries of new species have confounded a simple morphological diagnosis of the genus, as P. pentamera has 5-merous flowers, and P. oaxacana and P. krusei are polygamodioecious or androdioecious and have more typical parietal placentation. Formerly placed in the heterogeneous family Flacourtiaceae, Prockia is now classified in tribe Prockieae of Salicaceae, along with close relatives Banara, Hasseltiopsis, Pineda, and Neosprucea.

Prockia crucis is sometimes confused with Pineda ovata (Salicaceae) in the high elevations of Bolivia.

== Known species ==
The following species are accepted by Plants of the World Online:

- Prockia costaricensis Standl.
- Prockia crucis P.Browne ex L.
- Prockia flava H.Karst.
- Prockia jaliscana J.Jiménez Ram. & Cruz Durán
- Prockia krusei J.Jiménez Ram. & Cruz Durán
- Prockia oaxacana J.Jiménez Ram. & Cruz Durán
- Prockia pentamera A.H.Gentry
