= 1783 in Iceland =

- Decades: 1760s; 1770s; 1780s; 1790s; 1800s
- See also: Other events in 1783 · Timeline of Icelandic history

Events in the year 1783 in Iceland.

== Incumbents ==
- Monarch: Christian VII
- Governor of Iceland: Lauritz Andreas Thodal

== Events ==
- 1 May: A volcanic eruption started on the Reykjanes ridge and Nýey was formed.
- 8 June: Skaftáreldar erupts.
