= 1789 in Iceland =

- Decades: 1760s; 1770s; 1780s; 1790s; 1800s
- See also: Other events in 1789 · Timeline of Icelandic history

Events in the year 1789 in Iceland.

== Incumbents ==
- Monarch: Christian VII
- Governor of Iceland: Hans Christoph Diederich Victor von Levetzow

== Events ==
- June 8: Earthquakes affect Southern Iceland.
- July 23: Upon the death of his father, Finnur Jónsson, Hannes Finnsson becomes bishop of Skálholt.
- August 14 – Christian VII issues a decree that Icelandic bishops should be consecrated in Iceland in order to save money.

== Deaths ==
- July 23: Finnur Jónsson, bishop.
