= 1772 in Iceland =

- Decades: 1750s; 1760s; 1770s; 1780s; 1790s
- See also: Other events in 1772 · Timeline of Icelandic history

Events in the year 1772 in Iceland.

== Incumbents ==
- Monarch: Christian VII
- Governor of Iceland: Lauritz Andreas Thodal

== Events ==
- English naturalist Joseph Banks travelled around Iceland.
- March 18: Björn Jónsson becomes the first fully licensed pharmacist in Iceland.
