= 1776 in Iceland =

- Decades: 1750s; 1760s; 1770s; 1780s; 1790s
- See also: Other events in 1776 · Timeline of Icelandic history

Events in the year 1776 in Iceland.

== Incumbents ==
- Monarch: Christian VII
- Governor of Iceland: Lauritz Andreas Thodal

== Events ==
- 13 May: Christian VII ordered a mail service to be established.
