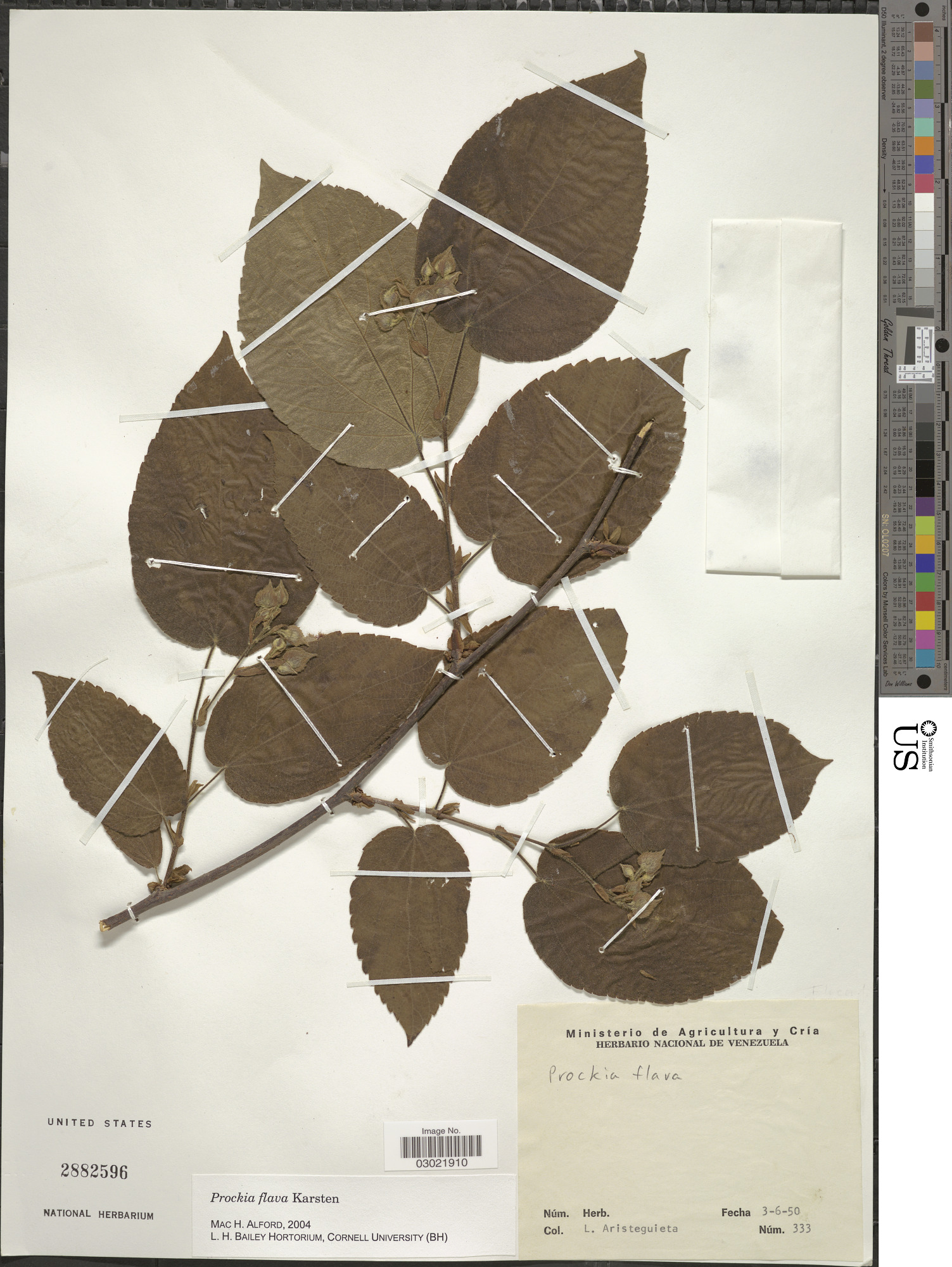
- A herbarium specimen of Prockia flava with aged leaves and flowers.

Conservation status
- Least Concern (IUCN 3.1)

Scientific classification
- Kingdom: Plantae
- Clade: Tracheophytes
- Clade: Angiosperms
- Clade: Eudicots
- Clade: Rosids
- Order: Malpighiales
- Family: Salicaceae
- Genus: Prockia
- Species: P. flava

Binomial name
- Prockia flava H.Karst.

= Prockia flava =

Species of flowering plant

Prockia flava is a species of flowering plant in the family Salicaceae, endemic to Venezuela. The plant was first described by Gustav Karl Wilhelm Hermann Karsten in 1863, and has a conservation status of least concern under the IUCN Red List.

== Description ==
Prockia flava is a shrub or tree reaching up to a reported 8 m (26 ft) in height, characterized by glabrous branches that are supported by a thin trunk, about 8 cm (3.1 in) in diameter, and covered in grayish lenticellate bark. The leaves are alternate, measuring up to 10 cm (3.9 in) long and 7 cm (2.8 in) wide; the shape is ovate, the apex is acute or acuminate, the base is cordate, and the margins are coarsely serrate or crenate. The leaf surface is chartaceous or membranaceous and densely tomentose, and the veins are quintuplinerved, coming in pairs that form an obscure reticulate pattern; the petiole is short and villous, measuring up to 2.5 cm (0.98 in) long.

The inflorescences occur as racemes that are either terminal or lax, measuring up to 6 cm (2.4 in) long, including the peduncle; each bears a small number of fragrant flowers, typically yellow or green, sometimes white in color. The stamens are numerous and yellow in color, featuring filaments that measure roughly 4 mm (0.16 in) long, tipped by minute, biloculate anthers. The ovary is subglobose and glabrous, tapering into a slender style, measuring up to 6 mm (0.24 in) long, and topped by a punctiform stigma. The fruit is a berry up to 6 mm (0.24 in) in diameter that turns red, purple, or black at maturity; the seeds are small and black in color, measuring about 1 mm (0.039 in) long.

== Distribution and habitat ==
The range of Prockia flava is restricted to Venezuela, primarily within the Capital District and the state of Miranda, but its distribution reportedly extends into the states of Bolívar, La Guaira, and Lara. Historically, Prockia flava was preserved from beyond its current range in Colombia, within the departments of Boyacá and Santander.

Prockia flava is a locally common tropical species recorded from a range of habitats at elevations typically up to 1,780 m (5,840 ft), but further up to 2,560 m (8,400 ft) in historical accounts. The plant favors a variety of environments and is tolerant of disturbance, often spotted growing in secondary vegetation. Mainly found on hilly or premontane terrain, its habitats include deciduous, semi-evergreen, and montane forests, thickets, scrubland, savannas, ravines, and gorges.

== Taxonomy ==
Prockia flava was first described by Gustav Karl Wilhelm Hermann Karsten in 1863 as the second addition to its genus. The family that Prockia and this species were placed into was initially ambiguous, either being grouped into Flacourtiaceae under the Cronquist system or Tiliaceae under the Bentham & Hooker system. Later on, these families became defunct because of the APG IV and APG systems respectively, resulting in Prockia being classified under Salicaceae according to modern systems; despite these taxonomic changes, the tribe Prockia is within, Prockieae, has remained with the genus and has not been absent in any of its classifications.

=== Etymology ===
The generic name Prockia is in honor of Christian Leberecht von Prøck, a Danish baron. The specific epithet, flava, means "yellow", likely denoting its flowers.

== Conservation status ==
Prockia flava has a conservation status of least concern under the IUCN Red List, primarily due to a lack of apparent fragmentation or population loss, as well as its high ecological tolerance; despite this, its population is suspected to be declining due to threats such as agricultural expansion. Although it is present in certain protected areas like the Caracas Botanical Garden and El Ávila National Park, it is not undergoing any known conservation efforts.
