= 1788 in Iceland =

- Decades: 1760s; 1770s; 1780s; 1790s; 1800s
- See also: Other events in 1788 · Timeline of Icelandic history

Events in the year 1788 in Iceland.

== Incumbents ==
- Monarch: Christian VII
- Governor of Iceland: Hans Christoph Diederich Victor von Levetzow

== Events ==
January 1 – Christian VII abolishes trade monopolies at the end of the year, trade in Iceland becomes free to all citizens of the King of Denmark.

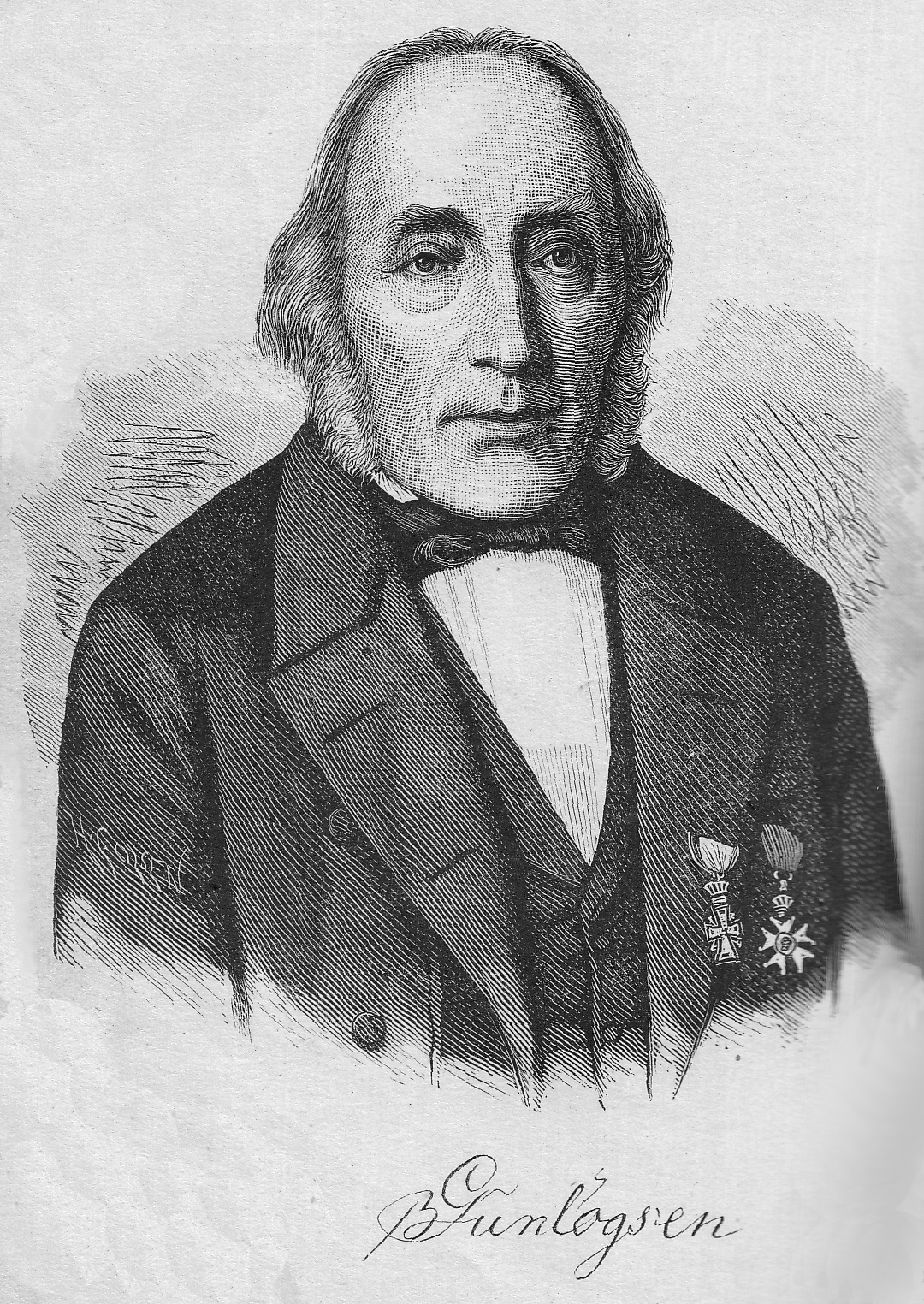
Björn Gunnlaugsson (1788 – 1876)

== Births ==
- September 25: Björn Gunnlaugsson, mathematician and cartographer.
