= 1782 in Iceland =

- Decades: 1760s; 1770s; 1780s; 1790s; 1800s
- See also: Other events in 1782 · Timeline of Icelandic history

Events in the year 1782 in Iceland.

== Incumbents ==
- Monarch: Christian VII
- Governor of Iceland: Lauritz Andreas Thodal

== Events ==
- The first Landpóstur services began, introducing the first postal services to Iceland.
- Egil's saga was first published in print.
