= Mount Palsson =

Mountain in Graham Land, Antarctica

Mount Palsson (67°20′S 65°32′W) is a large and conspicuous mountain in Antarctica rising to 1,190 m. The feature is located at the north end of Whirlwind Inlet between Flint Glacier and Demorest Glacier on the east coast of Graham Land. The mountain was photographed by the United States Antarctic Service (USAS), 1939–41. Named by United Kingdom Antarctic Place-Names Committee (UK-APC) for Sveinn Palsson (1762–1840), Icelandic naturalist who carried out pioneer work on glaciers and ice caps in Iceland.
