= Björn Gunnlaugsson =

Icelandic mathematician and cartographer

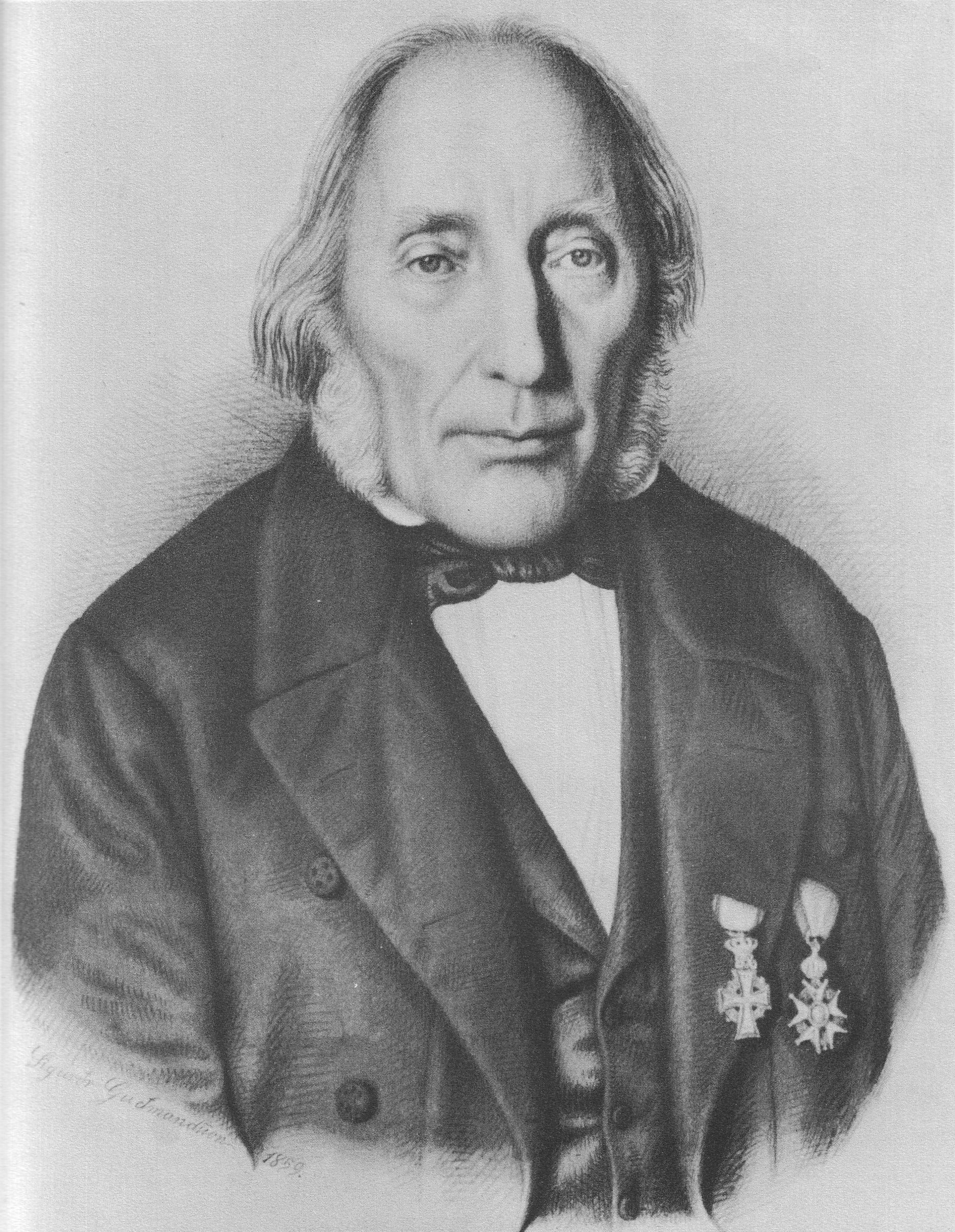
- Björn Gunnlaugsson wearing the two orders he received for his survey work. Portrait by Sigurður málari.
- Born: 25 September 1788; Tannstaðir, Iceland
- Died: 17 March 1876 (aged 87); Reykjavík, Iceland
- Other names: Gunnlaugsson, Bjorn; Gunnlaugsson, Bjørn
- Occupation: cartographer

Björn Gunnlaugsson^{[a]} (25 September 1788 – 17 March 1876)^{[b]} was an Icelandic mathematician and cartographer. For the Icelandic Literary Society, he surveyed the country from 1831 to 1843. The results of his work were published in a topographic map of Iceland at a scale of 1:480,000 on four sheets. It was the first complete map of Iceland and, although generally dated to 1844, was not completed until 1848. It was published under the direction of Olaf Nikolas Olsen in Copenhagen. In 1849, a smaller edition on one sheet at a scale of 1:960,000 appeared. For his survey work, Björn received the Order of the Dannebrog in 1846 and the French Légion d'honneur in 1859.

== Life ==
Björn was born at Tannstaðir, a remote farm on the Hrútafjörður in Húnavatnssýsla in north-western Iceland. Although the family was poor, they sent him to school to the local priests, who recognized his intellectual abilities. In 1808, Björn passed an exam in Reykjavík, obtaining a recommendation from the bishop for studying at the University of Copenhagen. But these plans were delayed by the Gunboat War between Denmark-Norway and the United Kingdom. Only after the end of the Napoleonic Wars could Björn travel to Denmark and enrolled in 1817 at the University of Copenhagen, where he studied theology and mathematics. During his studies, he won the university's gold medal for mathematics twice.

In 1822, a new post for a school teacher in Danish, mathematics, and history opened at the school of Bessastaðir^{[c]} in Iceland and was offered to Björn. He abandoned his theologic studies and accepted the post, returning to Iceland and taking up his duties as a school teacher on 14 May 1822. When the school was moved to Reykjavík in 1846, Björn followed. Five years later he was appointed chief assistant (Yfirkennari) to the rector. He retired in 1862.

Björn Gunnlaugsson was married twice; first to Ragnheiður Bjarnadóttir (died 1834), after her death he married in 1836 Guðlaug Aradóttir (died 1873).

== Work ==
Björn was an exceptional figure in early 19th-century Iceland. The abstract thoughts of this gentle learned man were beyond the grasp of most of his compatriots, who regarded him as an eccentric with few of the practical skills they so highly valued. Yet the simple folk also felt a certain kind of respectful awe towards this scholar.

Björn knew the inclination towards the practical of his fellow countrymen well. When he returned to Iceland as a school teacher for mathematics, the curriculum at the grammar school at Bessastaðir covered barely more than the four basic operations addition, subtraction, multiplication and division. In his inauguration speech at the school, he emphasized the practical applications of mathematics. He tried to take mathematics education to a higher level, but failed ultimately as his treatment of the subject was often too abstract for his pupils and he was, according to Benedikz, "not capable of handling a class of mathematical ignoramuses".

The only studied mathematician in Iceland in the 19th century, Björn was isolated from the academic community in Europe, and the intellectual environment made him turn to didactics and the applications of mathematics, and also to philosophy.

=== Uppdráttr Íslands – Map of Iceland ===
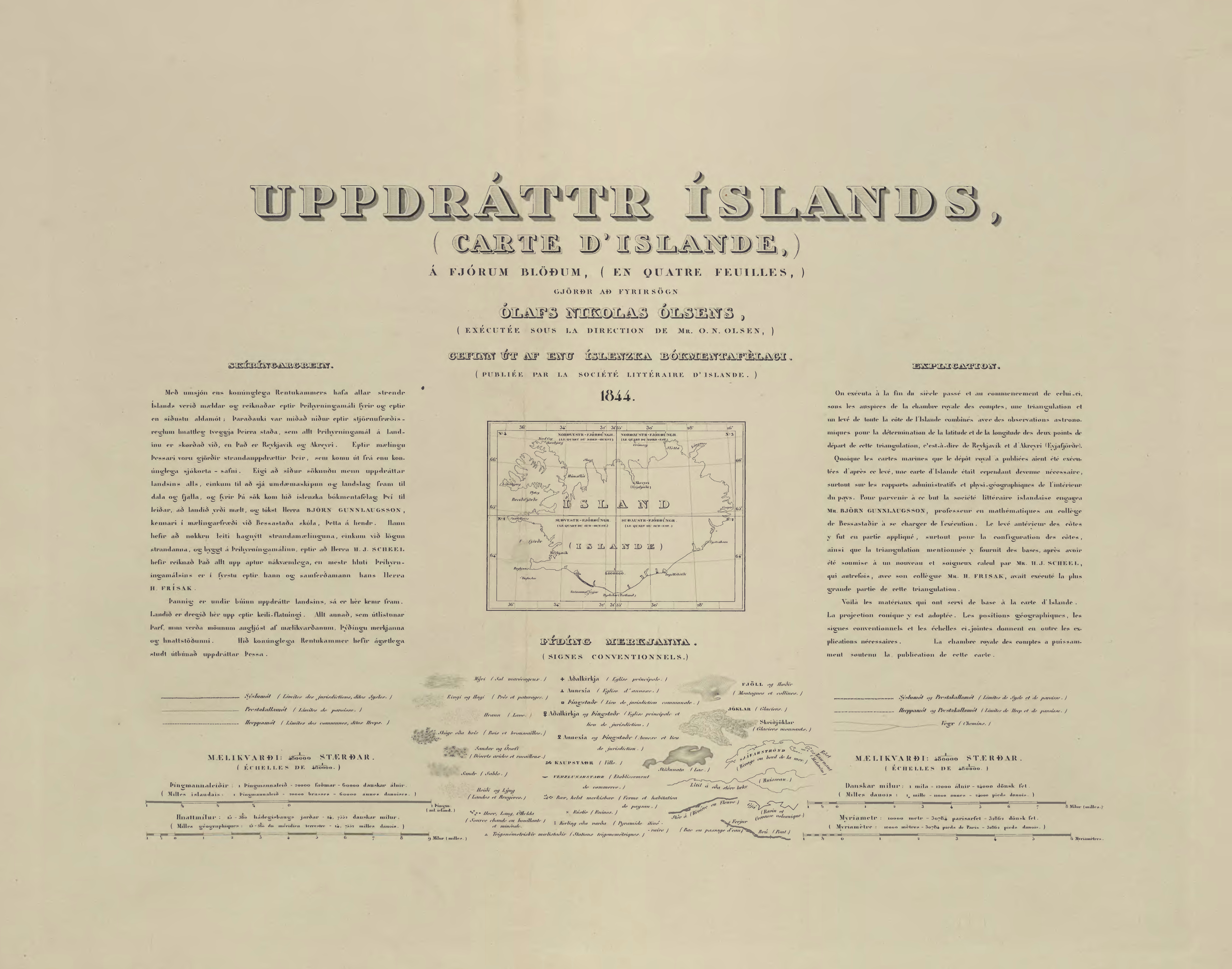
Title page of Uppdráttr Íslands. The map, attributed to Olsen, is mentioned in Jules Verne's A Journey to the Center of the Earth.

In August 1829, Björn, who had done in the early 1820s cartographic work under the direction of Heinrich Christian Schumacher at Altona, proposed to the Danish government to undertake a land survey of Iceland, and asked for the instruments used by the Danish Navy in their earlier coastal surveys to be sent to Iceland. His request was ignored at first. In 1831, the Literary Society of Iceland decided to sponsor him and helped him obtain the necessary instruments. From 1831 to 1843, Björn spent the summers surveying the country together with one assistant, and in the winters he would draw the maps. He did not lay a new baseline but started from the earlier coastal surveys the Danish Navy had undertaken in the period of 1774 to 1818, extending the triangulation inland. The Literary Society supported him with a yearly grant, and so did the Danish government from 1836 to 1846.

Björn's hand-drawn maps were sent to Copenhagen for preparing the publication. Olaf Nikolas Olsen had been appointed as the director of publication; he proposed to publish the map on four sheets, and he probably also defined the scale of 1:480,000 and the conical projection used. The map was published under Olsen's name, with the Literary Society of Iceland as the publisher, and paid by the Danish treasury. The title page was in Danish and French. Although dated 1844, it was probably not completed until 1848. In 1849, a smaller version of the map on one sheet at a scale of 1:960,000 was published.

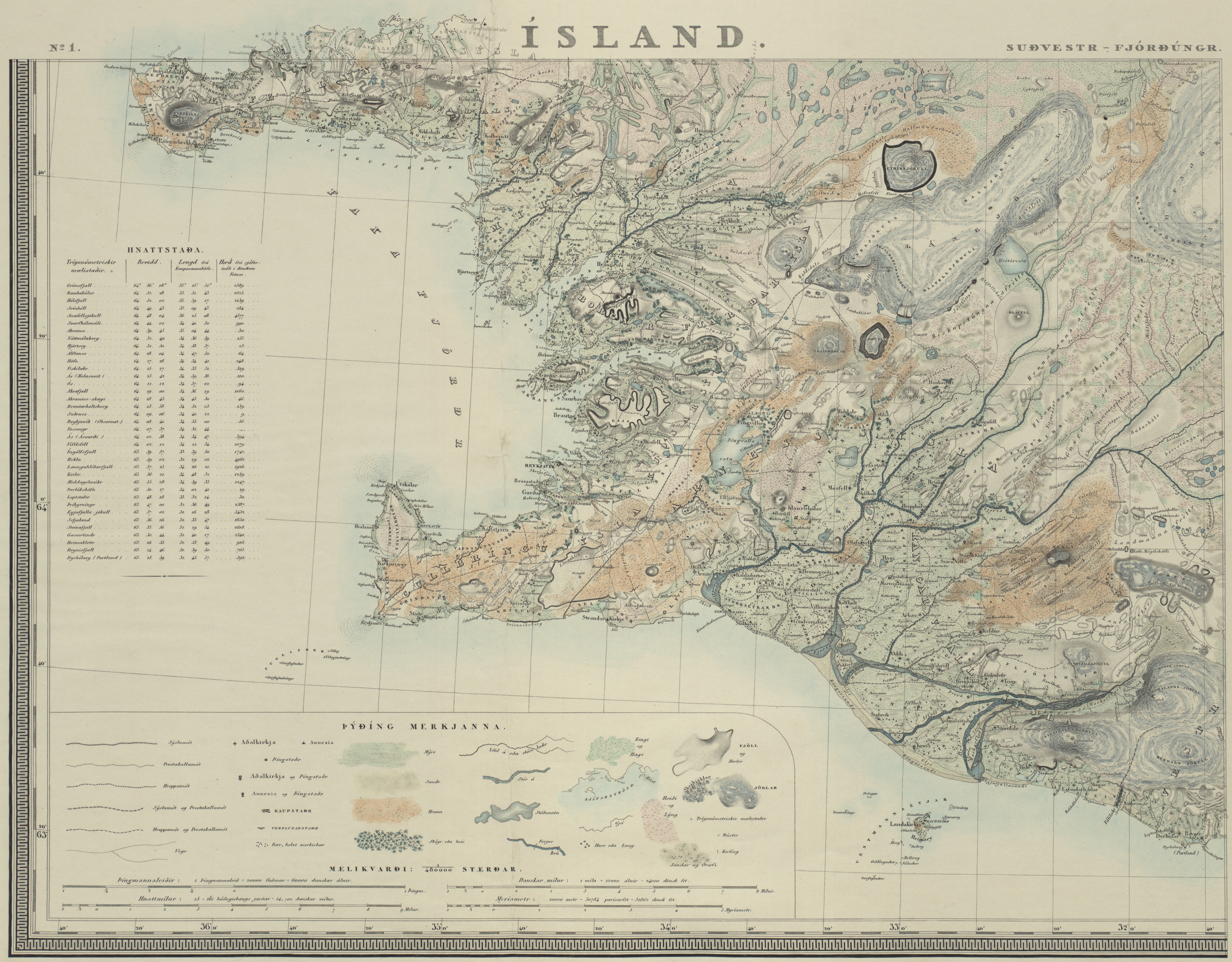
South-western quadrant of Björn Gunnlaugsson's 1844 map of Iceland, which was published on four sheets. The longitudes are given with respect to the meridian of Copenhagen.

Björn's survey formed the basis of many subsequent maps of Iceland for the next hundred years; new maps based on new surveys appeared only after World War II. It was an immense work, and Björn realized soon enough that one man alone would not be able to triangulate the whole island in his lifetime, and focused his attention on the inhabited areas. Yet he managed to survey a good part of the wilderness, too, even if he had to rely on the accounts of the local population in some remote areas. Björn was well aware of the inaccuracies in some regions; already in 1834, he wrote that one "should neither have too high or too low expectations of the map, nor trust too greatly nor too little in its usefulness or accuracy". The central highlands were sketchy on his map; they were mapped properly for the first time by Þorvaldur Thoroddsen, whose map was printed in 1901. Still, Björn's survey is considered a great advancement, especially given the limited resources he had at his disposition. In recognition of his outstanding survey work Björn Gunnlaugsson was awarded the Knight's Cross of the Order of the Dannebrog in 1846 and also received the Knight's cross of the French Légion d'honneur. The map was also exhibited at the World's fair at Paris in 1878, where it was awarded a prize.

=== Njóla – "Night" ===
Njóla is a long didactic theological-philosophical poem Björn wrote mostly during his survey travels when the weather did not permit him to work or in the evenings. It was published originally in the annual report of 1842 of the Bessastaðir school, and then in 1853 with some minor revisions and again in 1884 in Reykjavík. The poem begins by describing a night view of the skies, and then introduces the reader to astronomic distances, explaining how long a cannonball shot from the sun would take to reach each of the planets—and then the next star. In later stanzas, he describes the birth of the universe, covers Newton's laws and explains gravity. He interweaves such physics and mathematics framed as poetry with theological and philosophical musings about the purpose of the universe, the nature of good and evil, and God's intent.

=== Tölvísi: A mathematical textbook ===
Towards the end of his teaching career, Björn wrote down the mathematics he would have liked to teach in the Tölvísi, a mathematical textbook unprecedented in Iceland, both in its breadth and depth, but also in the rigour of its proofs. Moreover, it was written in Icelandic; in an attempt to make mathematics more accessible to his fellow countrymen, Björn even tried to find Icelandic names for mathematical concepts that hitherto had only been named using Danish or Latin words. But the work was largely ignored, and Björn's Icelandic terms never caught on. Begun in 1856, volume 1 was published in Reykjavík in 1865 by E. Þórðarson, but its second part was still unpublished in 2003 and existed only as an unpublished manuscript at the National and University Library of Iceland. Gunnlaugsson's first biographers, Melsteð and Jensson, wrote that it was "a book praised by all but read by extremely few".

== Notes ==
- ^{a} In English, Björn's name is sometimes also given as Bjorn Gunnlaugsson, omitting the diacritic on the Ö.
- ^{b} Björn's birthday is variously given as May 25, September 5 and September 28, see Otto J. Björnsson 1990, p. 3.
- ^{c} Before Björn's arrival, the school at Bessastaðir had had a staff of three teachers only, none of them knowledgeable in mathematics.

== Literature ==
- Benedikt S. Benedikz: "The Wise Man with the Child's Heart: Björn Gunnlaugsson, 1788–1876", in Scandinavian Studies 75 (4), pp. 567–590; 2003. ISSN 0036-5637.
- Kristín Bjarnadóttir: "Fundamental Reasons for Mathematical Education in Iceland", in Bharath Sriraman (Ed): International Perspectives on Social Justice in Mathematics Education (The Montana Mathematics Enthusiast (TMME) Monograph 1), p. 137–150; University of Montana, 2007. ISSN 1551-3440. URL last accessed 2007-09-12.
- Ágúst H. Bjarnason: "Um Björn Gunnlaugsson", in Timarit Þjóðræknisfélags Íslendinga, vol. 20 (1938), pp. 17–28.
- Emil Elberling: Gunnlaugsson, Björn, entry in Th. Westrin (ed.): Nordisk familjebok: Konversationslexikon och Realencyklopedi, 2nd ed. (1909), vol. 10, p. 643. URL last accessed 2007-09-19.
- Björn Gunnlaugsson: De mensura et delineatione Islandiae, Viðey, 1834.
- Kr. Kaalund: Gunnlaugsson, Bjørn, entry in C. F. Bricka (ed.): Dansk biografisk lexikon: tillige omfattende Norge for Tidsrummet 1537–1814; Gyldendal, Copenhagen 1887–1905; vol. VI (1892), p. 321f. URL last accessed 2007-09-12.
- Páll Melsteð & Björn Jensson: "Björn Gunnlaugsson", in Andvari, vol. 9 (1883), pp. 3–16.
- P.M.: Obituary for Björn Gunnlaugsson, Ísafold, 24 March 1876, p. 21. In Icelandic. URL last accessed 2012-11-08.
- Jökull Sævarsson: Gunnlaugsson's map of Iceland, (with text from Sigurðsson (1982)), Antique maps of Iceland, National and University Library of Iceland. URL last accessed 2007-09-12.
- Haraldur Sigurðsson: "Iceland on maps.", pp. 7–15 in Kortasafn Háskóla Íslands, Reykjavík 1982. URL last accessed 2007-09-12.
- Otto J. Björnsson: Brot úr ævi og starfi Björns Gunnlaugssonar riddara og yfirkennara; Reykjavík, Raunvísindastofnun Háskólans, 1990. In Icelandic.
- Þorvaldur Thoroddsen: Landfræðissaga Íslands; 4 volumes, Copenhagen; S. L. Möller, 1892–1904. In Icelandic. On Björn Gunnlaugsson, see in particular vol. 3, pp. 300ff.
