= 1784 in Iceland =

- Decades: 1760s; 1770s; 1780s; 1790s; 1800s
- See also: Other events in 1784 · Timeline of Icelandic history

Events in the year 1784 in Iceland.

== Incumbents ==
- Monarch: Christian VII
- Governor of Iceland: Lauritz Andreas Thodal

== Events ==
- The Laki eruption that began the year prior, continues until 7 February.
