= 1785 in Iceland =

- Decades: 1760s; 1770s; 1780s; 1790s; 1800s
- See also: Other events in 1785 · Timeline of Icelandic history

Events in the year 1785 in Iceland.

== Incumbents ==
- Monarch: Christian VII
- Governor of Iceland: Hans Christoph Diederich Victor von Levetzow

== Events ==
- The decision to move Skálholtsskóli to Reykjavík is made, with teaching beginning at Hólavallaskóli a year later.
- Finnur Jónsson, bishop of Skálholt resigned in the spring. Bishop Hannes Finnsson succeeded him.
