= 1769 in Iceland =

- Decades: 1750s; 1760s; 1770s; 1780s
- See also: Other events in 1769 · Timeline of Icelandic history

Events in the year 1769 in Iceland.

== Incumbents ==
- Monarch: Christian VII
- Governor of Iceland: Christian von Proeck

== Events ==
- Bárðarbunga erupts.
- The population of Iceland is recorded as being 46,201.
