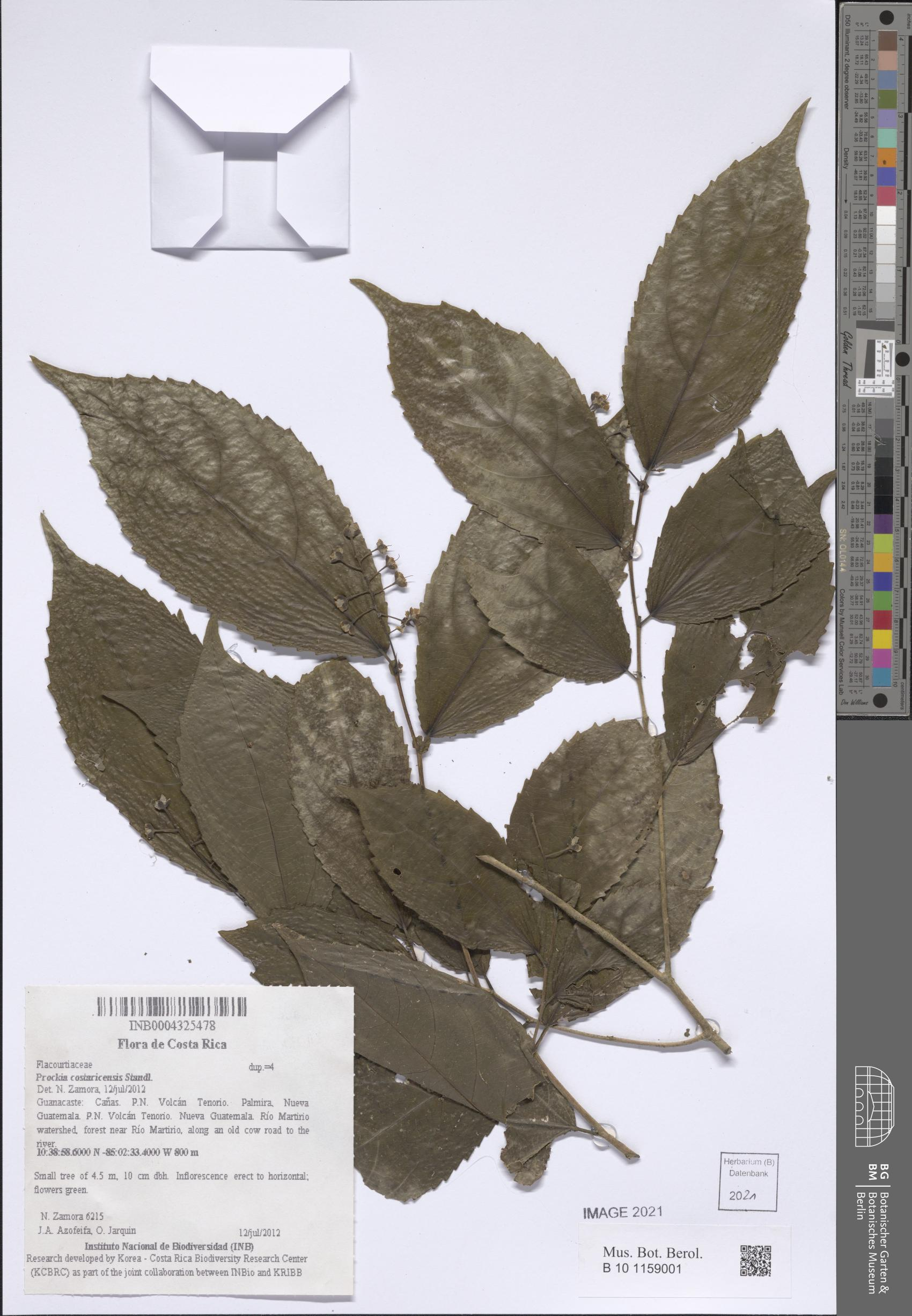
- A herbarium specimen of Prockia costaricensis with aged leaves and flowers.

Conservation status
- Vulnerable (IUCN 3.1)

Scientific classification
- Kingdom: Plantae
- Clade: Tracheophytes
- Clade: Angiosperms
- Clade: Eudicots
- Clade: Rosids
- Order: Malpighiales
- Family: Salicaceae
- Genus: Prockia
- Species: P. costaricensis

Binomial name
- Prockia costaricensis Standl.

= Prockia costaricensis =

Species of flowering plant

Prockia costaricensis is a species of flowering plant in the family Salicaceae, endemic to Costa Rica. The plant was first described by Paul Carpenter Standley in 1937, and has a conservation status of vulnerable under the IUCN Red List.

== Description ==
Prockia costaricensis is a shrub or tree reaching up to 7 m (23 ft) in height, characterized by gracile branches that are supported by a thin trunk roughly 10 cm (3.9 in) in diameter. The leaves are shiny, measuring up to 16.5 cm (6.5 in) long and 7.5 cm (3.0 in) wide; the shape is usually elliptic or oblong, the apex is rounded or obtuse, the base is acuminate or acute, and the margins are serrate or denticulate. The leaf surface is membranaceous and glabrous, while the veins are typically quintuplinerved; the petiole is short, measuring up to 7 mm (0.28 in) long.

The inflorescences occur as terminal racemes, oriented either erectly or horizontally, measuring approximately 1 cm (0.39 in) long; each bears a small number of hermaphroditic flowers, typically green or yellow in color. The stamens are reportedly orange, and the ovary is glabrous. The fruits are ovoid or globose, glabrous or glabrescent, and measure up to 9 mm (0.35 in) in diameter, beginning green and maturing to red.

== Distribution and habitat ==
The range of Prockia costaricensis is restricted to Costa Rica, spanning the provinces of Alajuela, Guanacaste, and Limón, in the cantons of Bagaces, Cañas, La Cruz, Liberia, Limón, Tilarán, and Upala. Historically, Prockia costaricensis was preserved from beyond its current range in Panama, within the province of Panamá.

Prockia costaricensis is a locally rare tropical species recorded from a range of habitats at elevations of up to a reported 1,048 m (3,438 ft). Being found in lowland or premontane environments, it occurs in moist tropical forest, riparian forest, and rainforest, as well as catchments, open pastures, swamp-adjacent areas, and along roadsides.

== Taxonomy ==
Prockia costaricensis was first described by Paul Carpenter Standley in 1937 as the third addition to its genus. The family that Prockia and this species were placed into was initially ambiguous, either being grouped into Flacourtiaceae under the Cronquist system or Tiliaceae under the Bentham & Hooker system. Later on, these families became defunct because of the APG IV and APG systems respectively, resulting in Prockia being classified under Salicaceae according to modern systems; despite these taxonomic changes, the tribe Prockia is within, Prockieae, has remained with the genus and has not been absent in any of its classifications.

=== Etymology ===
The generic name Prockia is in honor of Christian Leberecht von Prøck, a Danish baron. The specific epithet, costaricensis, means "Costa Rican", denoting where it is found.

== Conservation status ==
Prockia costaricensis has a conservation status of vulnerable under the IUCN Red List, primarily due to threats such as deforestation and habitat destruction through agricultural expansion; its limited extent and population exacerbate these issues. Although this plant is present in some protected areas over its range, it is not undergoing any other conservation efforts.
