= 1779 in Iceland =

- Decades: 1750s; 1760s; 1770s; 1780s; 1790s
- See also: Other events in 1779 · Timeline of Icelandic history

Events in the year 1779 in Iceland.

== Incumbents ==
- Monarch: Christian VII
- Governor of Iceland: Lauritz Andreas Thodal

== Events ==
- The Icelandic Society of Learning was founded by Icelandic students in Copenhagen, the group would later be replaced by the Icelandic Literary Society.

== Deaths ==
- 8 September: Bjarni Pálsson, doctor.
- Jón Ólafsson of Grunnavík, scholar.
