= 1777 in Iceland =

- Decades: 1750s; 1760s; 1770s; 1780s; 1790s
- See also: Other events in 1777 · Timeline of Icelandic history

Events in the year 1777 in Iceland.

== Incumbents ==
- Monarch: Christian VII
- Governor of Iceland: Lauritz Andreas Thodal

== Events ==
- Danish trade monopoly in Iceland: Changes were made allowing merchants to build houses and have permanent residence in Iceland.

== Births ==
- 14 January: Hannes Bjarnason, priest and poet.
