= 1781 in Iceland =

- Decades: 1760s; 1770s; 1780s; 1790s; 1800s
- See also: Other events in 1781 · Timeline of Icelandic history

Events in the year 1781 in Iceland.

== Incumbents ==
- Monarch: Christian VII
- Governor of Iceland: Lauritz Andreas Thodal

Tjöruhúsið (right) was constructed in 1781

== Events ==
- Tjöruhúsið, Neðstikaupstaður was built in Ísafjörður.

== Births ==
- 27 August: Finnur Magnússon, secret archivist and antiquarian
