= Prockia jaliscana =

Scientific classification
- Kingdom: Plantae
- Clade: Tracheophytes
- Clade: Angiosperms
- Clade: Eudicots
- Clade: Rosids
- Order: Malpighiales
- Family: Salicaceae
- Genus: Prockia
- Species: P. jaliscana

Binomial name
- Prockia jaliscana J.Jiménez Ram. & Cruz Durán

Species of flowering plant

Prockia jaliscana is a species of flowering plant in the family Salicaceae.

The plant is endemic to Mexico in the states of Colima, Guerrero, Jalisco, Michoacán, Nayarit and Oaxaca. It grows in low deciduous forests primarily within the seasonally dry tropical biome.

Prockia jaliscana was first described by Jaime Jiménez Ramírez and Ramiro Cruz Durán in 2018.

== Description ==
Prockia jaliscana shares similarities with Prockia oaxacana, but distinguishes itself by being dioecious, possessing stipules that are linear to lanceolate or foliaceous in shape, and exhibiting distinct male and female flowers compared to Prockia oaxacana. Its staminate flowers are apetalous, and its ovary contains ovules positioned on both basal and parietal placentae.
