= 1778 in Iceland =

- Decades: 1750s; 1760s; 1770s; 1780s; 1790s
- See also: Other events in 1778 · Timeline of Icelandic history

Events in the year 1778 in Iceland.

== Incumbents ==
- Monarch: Christian VII
- Governor of Iceland: Lauritz Andreas Thodal

== Events ==
- The Danish rigsdaler becomes the official currency of Iceland.
- The first residential building was built in Akureyri.

== Deaths ==
- 11 April: Miklabæjar-Solveig, Folklore figure.
