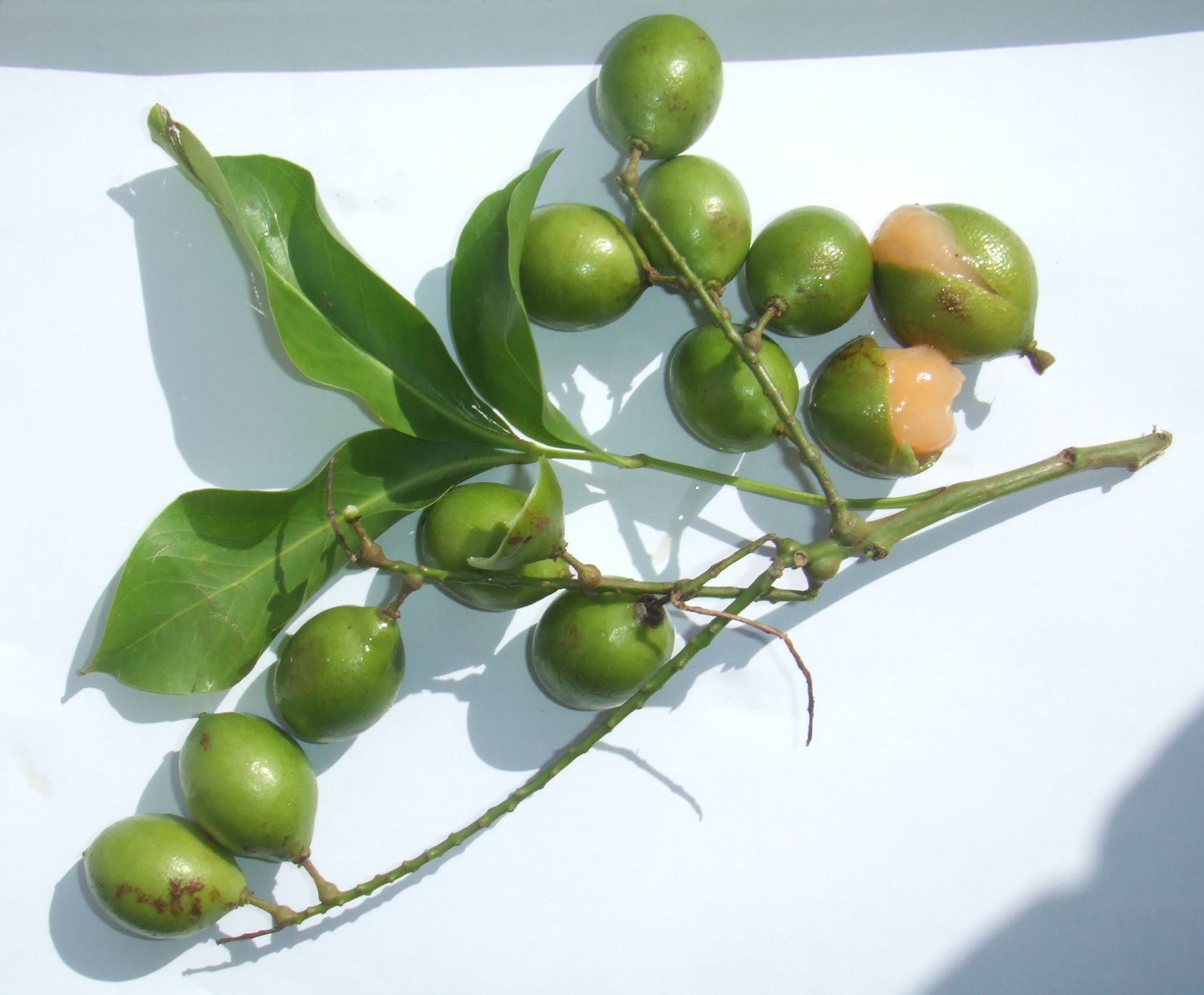
- Leaves and fruit

Conservation status
- Least Concern (IUCN 3.1)

Scientific classification
- Kingdom: Plantae
- Clade: Tracheophytes
- Clade: Angiosperms
- Clade: Eudicots
- Clade: Rosids
- Order: Sapindales
- Family: Sapindaceae
- Genus: Melicoccus
- Species: M. bijugatus

Binomial name
- Melicoccus bijugatus Jacq.

Synonyms
- Melicocca bijuga L. Baj Melicocca carpopodea Juss.

= Melicoccus bijugatus =

Species of plant

Melicoccus bijugatus is a fruit-bearing tree in the soapberry family Sapindaceae, native or naturalized across the New World tropics including South and Central America, and parts of the Caribbean. Its stone-bearing fruits, commonly called quenepa, kenèp or guinep, are edible. Other names for the fruits include limoncillo, Bajan ackee, chenet, Spanish lime, mamoncillo, and quenette (in the French Antilles).

== Taxonomy ==
- - M. espritosantensis
  - - M. pedicellaris
    - - - M. oliviformis
        - - M. antioquensis
          - M. novogranatensis
      - - M. aymardii
        - - M. lepidopetalus
          - - M. bijugatus
            - M. jimenezii

Phylogeny of Melicoccus based on morphological traits, showing the placement of M. bijugatus.

The genus Melicoccus was first described by Patrick Browne, an Irish physician and botanist, in 1756. This description was based on M. bijugatus trees which were cultivated in Puerto Rico. In 1760, Nikolaus Joseph von Jacquin described the first species in Browne's genus, which he named M. bijugatus. In 1762 Linnaeus used a spelling variation of the name Melicocca bijuga. Over the next two centuries, Linnaeus' spelling variation was used in almost all publications. A proposal was made in 1994 to conserve Melicocca over Melicoccus, but the proposal was rejected, leading to a restoration of the original version of the name.

In 1888 German taxonomist Ludwig Radlkofer placed Melicoccus in the tribe Melicocceae together with eight other genera. In his monograph on the Neotropical members of the tribe (Talisia and Melicoccus) Pedro Acevedo-Rodríguez suggested that although Talisia and Melicoccus appeared to form a monophyletic group, the other (Old World) genera probably did not belong to the same lineage.

The specific epithet bijugatus refers to the bijugate leaves, leaves which consist of two pairs of leaflets.

== Distribution ==
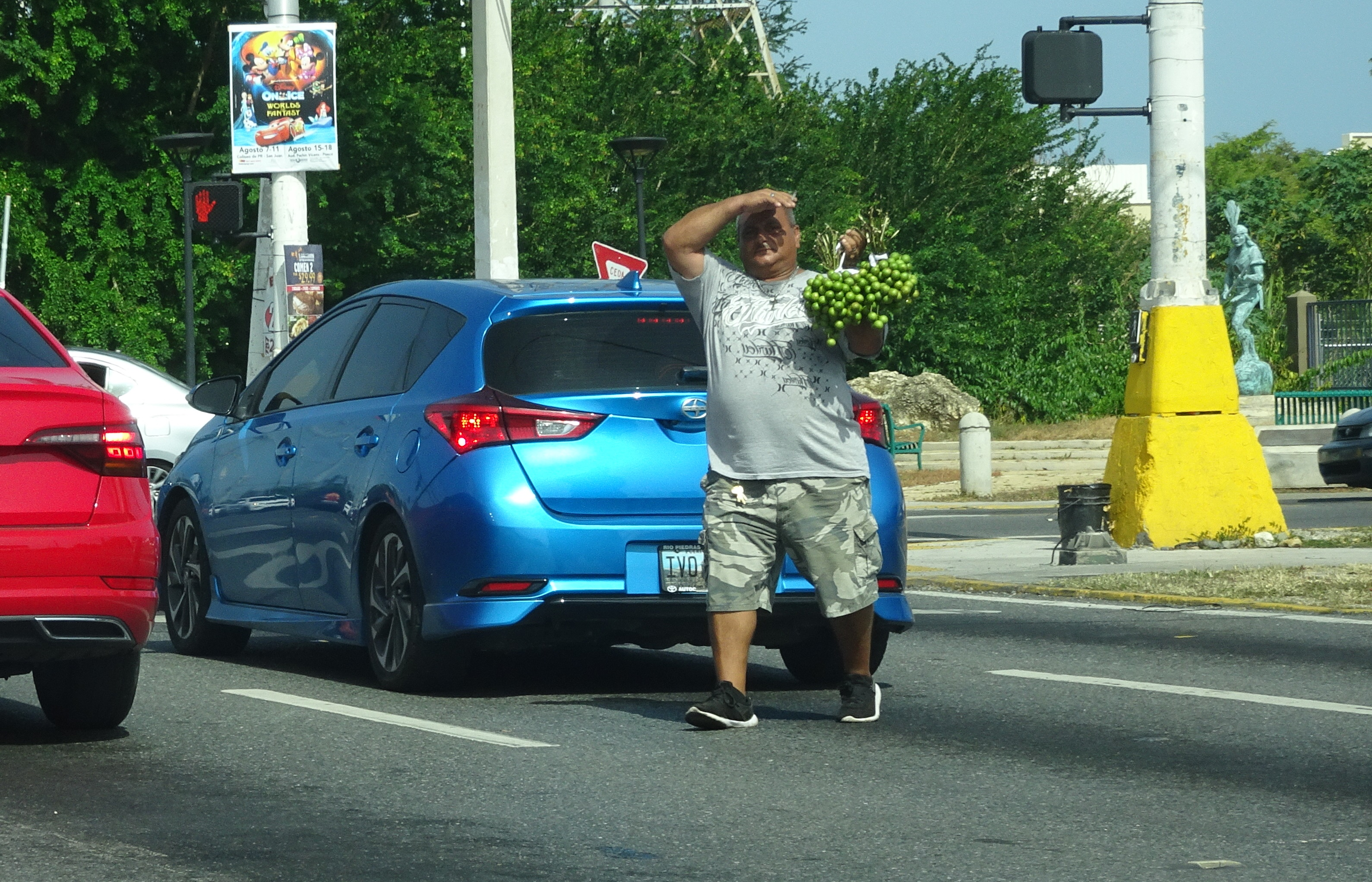
A man selling bundles of quenepas in Ponce, Puerto Rico

Melicoccus bijugatus is native to northern South America and naturalised in coastal and dry forest in Central America, the Caribbean and parts of the Old World tropics. It is believed to have been introduced into the Caribbean in pre-Columbian times. This fruit, known as quenepa in Puerto Rico, grows particularly abundantly in the municipality of Ponce, and there is a yearly celebration in that municipality known as Festival Nacional de la Quenepa (National Genip Fruit Festival). The fruit ripens during the warm summer months.

== Description ==
Trees can reach heights of up to 25 m (82 ft) and come with alternate, compound leaves. The leaves have four elliptic leaflets which are 5–12.5 cm (2.0–4.9 in) long and 2.5–5 cm (0.98–1.97 in) wide. They are typically dioecious plants, though autogamous trees occur from time to time. Flowers have four petals and eight stamens and produce ovoid, green drupes which are 2.5–4 cm (0.98–1.57 in) long and 2 cm (0.79 in) wide. Their pulp is orange, salmon or yellowish in color with a somewhat juicy and pasty texture.

=== Fruit ===
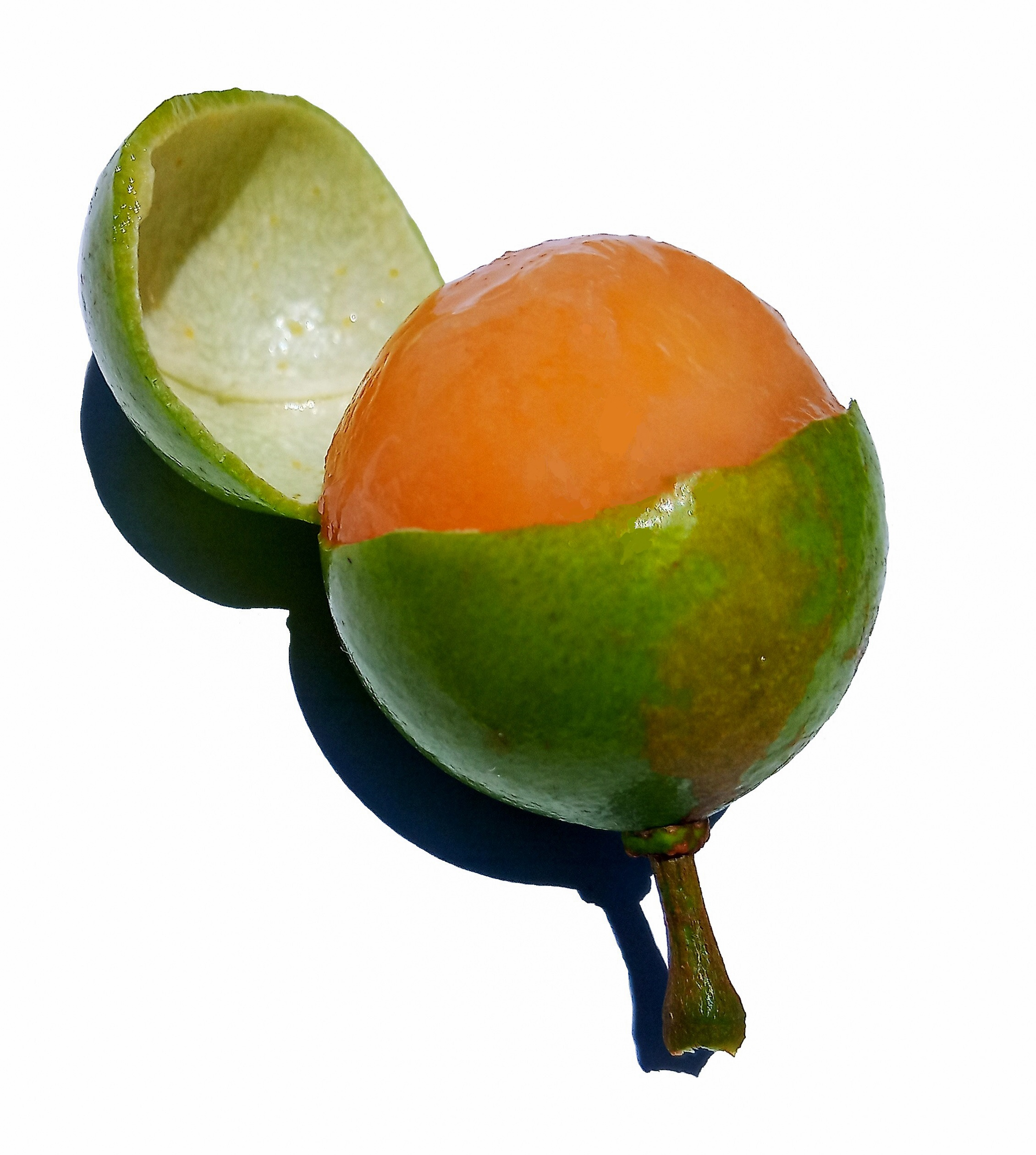
Quenepas fruit

The fruit is a round drupe, approximately 2–4 cm (0.79–1.57 in) in diameter, with a thin, brittle, green peel. The bulk of the fruit is made up of the one (or, rarely, two) whitish seeds, which are surrounded by an edible, orange, juicy, gelatinous pulp. There are efforts in Puerto Rico and Florida to produce cultivars with a more favourable flesh-to-seed ratio.

When ripe, the fruits have a sweet-tart or lime-like flavor. The seed, being slippery, is a potential choking hazard to small children.

== Use ==
The main use of the limoncello is its sweet fruits, which are consumed fresh or canned, and can also be used in the preparation of soft drinks and alcoholic beverages. It can produce a strong yellow dye, although it is rarely used for this purpose.

The seed is a source of the soapberry toxin hypoglycin A, which is also sometimes detectable in the fruit. Hypoglycin levels in the fruit may vary with ripeness, as occurs for ackee fruit.

The roasted seeds are claimed to be edible; the roasted seed kernels, together with the bark or leaves, are used to produce a traditional remedy for dysentery and bowel disorders. When roasted, the pit resembles chestnuts. The indigenous peoples of the Orinoco river consume them as a substitute for cassava, and in Nicaragua, the seeds are ground and made into horchata for use as a traditional antidiarrheal.

The wood of the tree is pale, dense and moderately heavy with a fine grain, and is used for construction, carpentry, and fine cabinetmaking. However, it is not particularly durable, so its use is limited to indoors. The species is also commonly planted along roadsides as an ornamental tree.

== Quenepa in popular culture ==
The quenepa fruit is frequently referenced in popular culture in the Spanish Caribbean, including songs such as "Suave" by Puerto Rican rapper René Pérez (Residente) as part of the band Calle 13.

== See also ==
- Korlan
- Longan
- Lychee
- Rambutan
