= Olaf Nikolas Olsen =

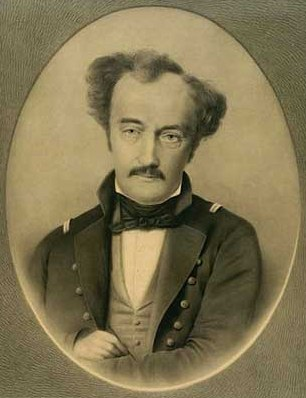
Olaf Nikolas Olsen

Olaf Nikolas Olsen (4 March 1794 – 19 December 1848, also spelt Oluf Nicolai or Nicolaj) was a cartographer and an officer of the Danish army. He taught cartography at the Royal Cadet School and from 1830 on also at the new Army Academy. In 1836 was made a member of the General Staff, and in 1842 he was named head of the topographic department of the staff, with the rank of a Major. In 1848, he was promoted to the rank of colonel.

As a cartographer, he edited and published many maps of Europe. In his function at the General Staff, he directed the publication of the Danish Ordnance Maps. He also oversaw the publication of the first complete map of Iceland after a survey done by Björn Gunnlaugsson in the years 1831 to 1843.
