= Þorvaldur Thoroddsen =

Icelandic geologist and geographer

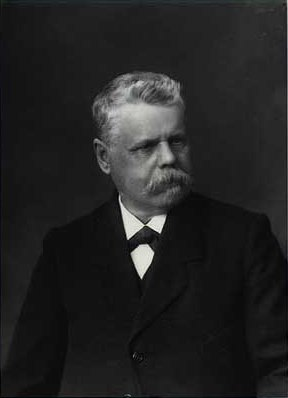
Þorvaldur Thoroddsen.

Þorvaldur Thoroddsen (6 June 1855 – 28 September 1921) was an Icelandic geologist and geographer.

== Biography ==
Þorvaldur was the son of the writer Jón Thoroddsen. He graduated from the Learned School of Reykjavík in 1875 and then immediately proceeded to Copenhagen to further his studies. He studied natural history and zoology but also nourished a strong interest in geology; this was amplified in 1876 when he served as a guide for the geologist Johannes Frederik Johnstrup in an expedition to Iceland to study Askja and the volcanoes at Mývatn.

Unable to complete his studies for financial reasons Þorvaldur accepted a teaching placement at Möðruvellir in the north of Iceland in 1880 and worked there until 1885 when he became an adjunct at the Learned School. In 1887 he married Þóra, daughter of bishop Pétur Pétursson. They had one child, Sigríður (1888–1903). Þóra died in 1917.

In 1899, Þorvaldur resigned his position at the Learned School. The Althing granted him a generous pension which enabled him to live in Copenhagen and work on research and writing. In 1894, he was granted an honorary doctoral degree from the University of Copenhagen and in 1902 he was named Professor.

== Work ==
During his expedition with Johnstrup, Þorvaldur was stricken by the nature of Iceland's large uninhabited areas. He resolved to investigate the nature of the island, especially its geology which up till then had been sparsely mapped and studied. From 1881 to 1898 he undertook expeditions to gather data. During his work, Þorvaldur ran into the limitations of the 1848 map of Iceland by Björn Gunnlaugsson. Björn had concentrated his precise measurements on the inhabited areas and a significant amount of work remained to be done in the central highlands. In 1901 Þorvaldur published a geological map of Iceland, where he incorporated his corrections to Björn Gunnlaugsson's map.

During the time he lived in Copenhagen, Þorvaldur wrote a number of books and articles on geology and geography, especially as regards Iceland. Initially he was a liberal evolutionist but his ideas on biology and politics changed greatly during his career and later in life he can be described as a very conservative anti-evolutionist.

He was awarded the Charles P. Daly Medal by the American Geographical Society in 1906.

He died in Copenhagen, aged 66.
