= Jón Eyþórsson =

Icelandic meteorologist (1895–1968)

Jón Pétur Eyþórsson
- Born: 27 January 1895; Þingeyrar, Austur-Húnavatnssýsla, Iceland
- Died: 6 March 1968 (aged 73)
- Other name: Jón Eythórsson
- Citizenship: Iceland
- Education: University of Copenhagen (1917–1919); University of Oslo (1919–1923); University of Bergen (1923–1926)
- Known for: Glacier tracking
- Scientific career
- Fields: Meteorology; Glaciology

Jón Pétur Eyþórsson (27 January 1895 – 6 March 1968) was an Icelandic meteorologist. He is known for his work measuring glaciers and tracking the relationship between glacial movement and weather patterns. Jón also coined the term "glacier mice" for a peculiar form of moss colony.

== Education and professional life ==
Jón was born on a farm in Þingeyrar in Iceland's Northwestern Region and graduated from the Menntaskólinn í Reykjavík gymnasium in 1917. He then studied natural sciences the University of Copenhagen in Denmark for two years, before moving to Norway, completing a cand.mag. advanced degree at the University of Oslo in 1923. He then studied meteorology at the Geophysical Institute, University of Bergen until 1926. While in Norway, Jón worked with Hans Wilhelmsson Ahlmann to set up a high-altitude meteorological station on Fannaråki, the first such station in Scandinavia .

After completing his schooling, Jón worked at the Icelandic Meteorological Office before heading up the Reykjavík Airport weather office from 1953 to 1965. He also served as president of Iceland Touring Association hiking and mountaineering association intermittently from 1935 to 1961. In November 1950, he founded the Iceland Glaciological Society, serving as its first chair and editor of its journal, Jökull. Jón was also one of the founders of Ríkisútvarpið, the Icelandic public broadcaster, serving as chairman of its board in the 1930s.

== Contributions to glaciology ==
In 1932, working with local volunteers, Jón began systematic observations of margins of major Icelandic glaciers and continued this work until his death. He also, from 1953 to 1966, published regular reports on drift ice in the North Atlantic. Through his observations and the annual lists of measurements published in Jökull, Jón helped standardize the names of Iceland's glaciers.

Jón wrote and translated many books, including publishing in 1945 a translation of the previously overlooked 1795 treatise by Sveinn Pálsson describing how glaciers flow.

In 1950, he published a brief description of glacial moss colonies, which he dubbed jökla-mýs (Icelandic for "glacier mice").
