= 1798 in Iceland =

- Decades: 1770s; 1780s; 1790s; 1800s; 1810s
- See also: Other events in 1798 · Timeline of Icelandic history

Events in the year 1798 in Iceland.

== Incumbents ==
- Monarch: Christian VII
- Governor of Iceland: Ólafur Stefánsson

== Events ==
- July 20: The Althing met at Þingvellir for the last time.The few who had attended returned home from Þingvellir due to poor conditions, and thus ended the governments tenure at the site, which had lasted since 930.

== Births ==
- 4 March: Sigurður Breiðfjörð, poet.
