= 1790 in Iceland =

- Decades: 1770s; 1780s; 1790s; 1800s; 1810s
- See also: Other events in 1790 · Timeline of Icelandic history

Events in the year 1790 in Iceland.

== Incumbents ==
- Monarch: Christian VII
- Governor of Iceland: Ólafur Stefánsson

== Events ==
- April 14: Ólafur Stefánsson is appointed Governor of Iceland, the first Icelander to hold the position.
- Langabúð, the oldest house in Djúpivogur, was built.
