= Talisia setigera =

Conservation status
- Endangered (IUCN 3.1)

Scientific classification
- Kingdom: Plantae
- Clade: Tracheophytes
- Clade: Angiosperms
- Clade: Eudicots
- Clade: Rosids
- Order: Sapindales
- Family: Sapindaceae
- Genus: Talisia
- Species: T. setigera

Binomial name
- Talisia setigera Radlk.

Species of flowering plant

Talisia setigera is a species of plant in the family Sapindaceae. It is endemic to Ecuador. It can also be found in Peru and Colombia.
