= 1791 in Iceland =

- Decades: 1770s; 1780s; 1790s; 1800s; 1810s
- See also: Other events in 1791 · Timeline of Icelandic history

Events in the year 1791 in Iceland.

== Incumbents ==
- Monarch: Christian VII
- Governor of Iceland: Ólafur Stefánsson

== Events ==
- December 31 – Schoolboys from Hólavallarskóli celebrate the first known New Year's Eve bonfire in Iceland.

== Births ==
- 24 February: Sveinbjörn Egilsson, theologian and poet.
