= 1787 in Iceland =

- Decades: 1760s; 1770s; 1780s; 1790s; 1800s
- See also: Other events in 1787 · Timeline of Icelandic history

Events in the year 1787 in Iceland.

== Incumbents ==
- Monarch: Christian VII
- Governor of Iceland: Hans Christoph Diederich Victor von Levetzow

== Events ==
- Autumn: A ship arrived from Copenhagen with materials for the cathedral in Reykjavík and six craftsmen to work on the construction.
- A law was passed on the protection of reindeer, which had been imported in 1784 and 1787.

== Births ==
- 1 October: Björn Blöndal, District Commissioner.
- 18 June: Gísli Konráðsson, folklorist
