= 1796 in Iceland =

- Decades: 1770s; 1780s; 1790s; 1800s; 1810s
- See also: Other events in 1796 · Timeline of Icelandic history

Events in the year 1796 in Iceland.

== Incumbents ==
- Monarch: Christian VII
- Governor of Iceland: Ólafur Stefánsson

== Events ==
- November 6 – Reykjavík Cathedral is consecrated.
- December 5 – Schoolboys from Hólavallarskóli stage the play Hrólfur or Slaður og trúgirni by Sigurður Pétursson, which is generally considered the first Icelandic theatre production.

== Births ==
- 29 September: Hjálmar Jónsson, poet.
