= Glacier mice =

Free-moving globular moss colonies found on and near glaciers

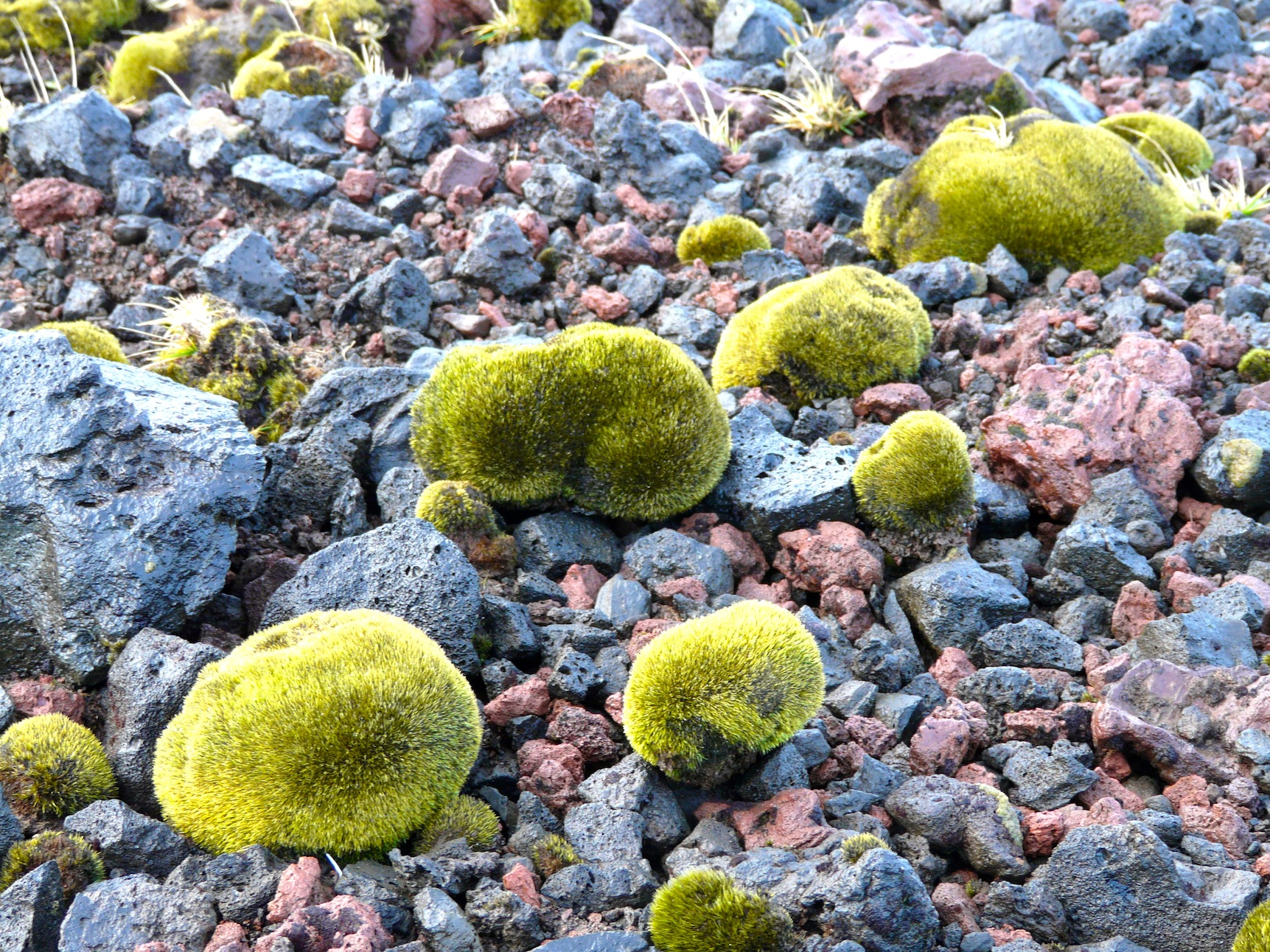
Glacier mice on Île de la Possession.

Glacier mice are colonies of mosses found on some glaciers and adjacent ecosystems. They are composed of multiple species of moss and can also host other species, such as nematode worms, springtails, and water bears. Although what preconditions are necessary for glacier mice to form has yet to be determined, they have been observed in Alaska, Chile, Greenland, Iceland, Svalbard, Uganda and Venezuela, as well as several sub-Antarctic islands. In at least some cases, glacier mice apparently reproduce asexually due to the effect of the harsh glacier environment on traditional moss reproduction strategies.

Glacier mice are notable for their movement across the ice, which appears to be non-random, taking the form of herd-like behavior. This movement does not appear to be solely the product of wind or the direction of a slope.

== Mechanism ==
Gilbert and Bartholomaus's evidence shows a southern migration in Alaska which suggests a mechanism: the dark coloured moss absorbs sun energy on the south side, and casts a shadow on the north side. This causes the ice to melt only on the sunny side, creating a small depression, the moss then rolls into the depression and the process continues creating gradual southern motion (N. Hemisphere) and northern motion (S. Hemisphere).

On average, they move about 2.5 cm (0.98 in) per day. The use of accelerometers has demonstrated that glacier mice do in fact rotate and roll, rather than simply sliding across the ice, over time exposing all of their surfaces. Measurements of glacier mice show that they retain heat and moisture, creating a suitable ecosystem for microorganisms that otherwise could not live on a glacier. Glacier mice are believed to persist for six years or longer.

Glacier mice were first described in 1950 by Icelandic meteorologist Jón Eyþórsson, who referred to them as jökla-mýs, which is Icelandic for "glacier mice."
