= 1799 in Iceland =

- Decades: 1770s; 1780s; 1790s; 1800s; 1810s
- See also: Other events in 1799 · Timeline of Icelandic history

Events in the year 1799 in Iceland.

== Incumbents ==
- Monarch: Christian VII
- Governor of Iceland: Ólafur Stefánsson

== Events ==
- The Alþingi is held for the first time in Reykjavík. The assembly was held in Hólavallarskóli.
- King Christian VII appointed a committee to make recommendations for improvements in the affairs of Hólar School.
