= 1800 in Iceland =

- Decades: 1780s; 1790s; 1800s; 1810s; 1820s
- See also: Other events in 1800 · Timeline of Icelandic history

Events in the year 1800 in Iceland.

== Incumbents ==
- Monarch: Christian VII
- Governor of Iceland: Ólafur Stefánsson

== Events ==
- June 6: The Althingi is formally dissolved, with the National High Court being established the following year.
- The first Icelandic cookbook, A Simple Cooking Pocket for Older Manna Housewives, was published.
