= Björn Halldórsson =

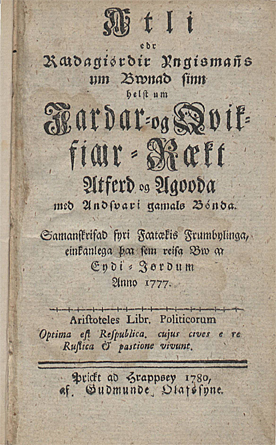
Atli was printed in the Hrappsey printing house and published there in 1780

Björn Halldórsson (5 December, 1724 – 24 August, 1794) was an Icelandic priest and author based at Setberg, Grundarfjörður. He is also believed to be the first person to grow potatoes in Iceland. His most popular book, Atli was published in 1780.

== Personal life ==
Halldórsson was the brother-in-law of Eggert Ólafsson, being married to Rannveig Ólafsdóttir.
