= 1795 in Iceland =

- Decades: 1770s; 1780s; 1790s; 1800s; 1810s
- See also: Other events in 1795 · Timeline of Icelandic history

Events in the year 1795 in Iceland.

== Incumbents ==
- Monarch: Christian VII
- Governor of Iceland: Ólafur Stefánsson

== Births ==
- 27 October: Agnes Magnúsdóttir, criminal (Murder of Nathan Ketilsson)
- Rósa Guðmundsdóttir, poet
