= 1793 in Iceland =

- Decades: 1770s; 1780s; 1790s; 1800s; 1810s
- See also: Other events in 1793 · Timeline of Icelandic history

Events in the year 1793 in Iceland.

== Incumbents ==
- Monarch: Christian VII
- Governor of Iceland: Ólafur Stefánsson

== Events ==
- A school cairn, a rectangular stone tower, was erected at Skólvörðuholt in Reykjavík, where a statue of Leifur Eiríksson now stands.
