= 1801 in Iceland =

- Decades: 1780s; 1790s; 1800s; 1810s; 1820s
- See also: Other events in 1801 · Timeline of Icelandic history

Events in the year 1801 in Iceland.

== Incumbents ==
- Monarch: Christian VII
- Governor of Iceland: Ólafur Stefánsson

== Events ==
- The Bishop of Iceland position is created, with Geir Vídalín being the first to hold the position.
- 10 August: With the Althing being disbanded by royal decree in the year prior, a new High Court in Reykjavík took over the functions of Lögrétta. The three appointed judges convened in Hólavallarskóli.
- A Census was held in Iceland, along with other parts of the Denmark-Norway.

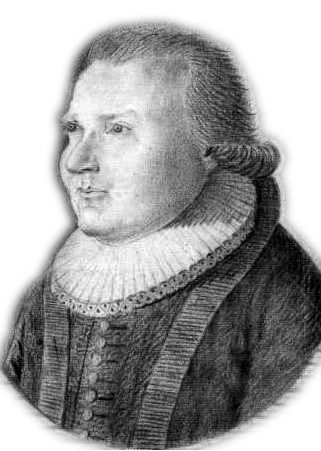
Geir Vídalín Jónsson (27 October 1761 – 20 September 1823), the first Bishop of Iceland.
