= Prockia oaxacana =

Conservation status
- Endangered (IUCN 3.1)

Scientific classification
- Kingdom: Plantae
- Clade: Tracheophytes
- Clade: Angiosperms
- Clade: Eudicots
- Clade: Rosids
- Order: Malpighiales
- Family: Salicaceae
- Genus: Prockia
- Species: P. oaxacana

Binomial name
- Prockia oaxacana J.Jiménez Ram. & Cruz Durán

Species of flowering plant

Prockia oaxacana is a species of flowering plant in the family Salicaceae.

The plant is endemic to Mexico in the states of Colima, Guerrero, Jalisco, Michoacán, Nayarit and Oaxaca. It occurs primarily within the wet tropical biome, where it grows in tropical deciduous forests, forests of Pinus and Quercus, and on limestone soil, at altitudes of 1,480–2,050 m (4,860–6,730 ft).

Prockia oaxacana was first described by Jaime Jiménez Ramírez and Ramiro Cruz Durán in 2008.

== Description ==
Prockia oaxacana is a shrub or small tree, reaching a height of 2–6 m (6 ft 7 in – 19 ft 8 in). It bears resemblance to Prockia krusei but is distinguishable by its polygamo-dioecious reproductive system, exfoliating bark, stipules with marginal glands, flowers bearing petals, a unilocular ovary with parietal placentation, and comparatively smaller sepals, berries, and seeds.

== Conservation status ==
The population size of Prockia oaxacana is estimated at approximately 250 mature individuals, though future studies may reveal it to be more abundant. If additional subpopulations are discovered, the AOO could change, warranting a reassessment of its conservation status. The primary threat to this taxon arises from land use changes driven by urban expansion and associated human activities. While two ex situ collections exist, the habitat is under significant threat, highlighting the urgent need for in situ protection measures. Recommended actions include promoting sustainable production practices, providing livelihood alternatives to deforestation, implementing legal regulations, offering conservation incentives, and monitoring habitat trends to ensure the long-term survival of the species. Due to its restricted EOO and AOO, it is listed as EN by the IUCN Red List.
