= Talisia bullata =

Conservation status
- Critically Endangered (IUCN 3.1)

Scientific classification
- Kingdom: Plantae
- Clade: Tracheophytes
- Clade: Angiosperms
- Clade: Eudicots
- Clade: Rosids
- Order: Sapindales
- Family: Sapindaceae
- Genus: Talisia
- Species: T. bullata

Binomial name
- Talisia bullata Radlk.

Species of flowering plant

Talisia bullata is a species of plant in the family Sapindaceae. It is endemic to Ecuador.
