= Setberg, Grundarfjörður =

Location in Grundarfjörður, Iceland

Setberg
- Kirkjustaður (Farm and Parsonage)
- Location in Iceland
- Coordinates: 64°57′N 23°12′W
- Country: Iceland
- Constituency: Northwest
- Region: Western Region
- Municipality: Grundarfjörður
- Time zone: UTC+0 (GMT)

Setberg (Icelandic pronunciation: [ˈsɛtˌpɛrk]) is a "Kirkjustaður" (lit. 'church place') located on the Snæfellsnes peninsula, in the Grundarfjörður municipality.

The Setberg Church (Icelandic: Setbergskirkja [ˈsɛtˌpɛrksˌcʰɪr̥ca, -ˌpɛr̥s-]) is a small, towerless wooden church located in Setberg. The church was erected in 1892 by Sveinn Jónsson. Although the current church was built in the 19th century, there has been a church in Setberg since the 12th century.
Prior to the Icelandic Reformation the patronage of the Setberg Church was the holy cross.

== Notable people ==
- Steinn Jónsson (c. 1660-1739), Bishop who served in Setberg, printed the bible in Hólar for the third time in Iceland.
- Björn Halldórsson (c. 1724–1794), Priest who served in Setberg, possibly first person to grow potatoes in Iceland.

== Sources ==
- "Setbergskirkja (1892) ". kirkjukort.net (in Icelandic). Retrieved July 27, 2020.
- "Kirkju- og Safnaðarstarf". grundarfjordur.is (in Icelandic). Retrieved July 27, 2020.
