= 1786 in Iceland =

- Decades: 1760s; 1770s; 1780s; 1790s; 1800s
- See also: Other events in 1786 · Timeline of Icelandic history

Events in the year 1786 in Iceland.

== Incumbents ==
- Monarch: Christian VII
- Governor of Iceland: Hans Christoph Diederich Victor von Levetzow

== Events ==
- November 17 – Six locations are granted municipal rights. This year is regarded as the founding of Reykjavík.
- Teaching began at Hólavallarskóli in Reykjavík.

== Births ==
- September 4 – Þórður Sveinbjörnsson, politician
- December 30 – Bjarni Thorarensen, poet and official
