= 1792 in Iceland =

- Decades: 1770s; 1780s; 1790s; 1800s; 1810s
- See also: Other events in 1792 · Timeline of Icelandic history

Events in the year 1792 in Iceland.

== Incumbents ==
- Monarch: Christian VII
- Governor of Iceland: Ólafur Stefánsson

== Events ==
- Ingibjörg Jónsdóttir, a single 32-year-old woman is publicly executed by beheading for concealment.

== Births ==
- Natan Ketilsson, physician and murder victim.
