= Prockiopsis =

Scientific classification
- Kingdom: Plantae
- Clade: Tracheophytes
- Clade: Angiosperms
- Clade: Eudicots
- Clade: Rosids
- Order: Malpighiales
- Family: Achariaceae
- Genus: Prockiopsis; Baill.

Genus of flowering plant

Prockiopsis is a genus of flowering plants belonging to the family Achariaceae.

It is native to Madagascar.

The genus name of Prockiopsis is in honour of Christian Leberecht von Prøck (1718–1780), a Danish baron. He served as Governor-General of the Danish West Indies colonies from 1756–1766. It was first described and published in Bull. Mens. Soc. Linn. (Paris) Vol.1 on page 573 in 1886.

== Known species ==
According to Kew:

- Prockiopsis calcicola G.E.Schatz & Lowry
- Prockiopsis grandis G.E.Schatz & Lowry
- Prockiopsis hildebrandtii Baill.
- Prockiopsis orientalis Capuron ex G.E.Schatz & Lowry
- Prockiopsis razakamalalae G.E.Schatz, Lowry & Rakotovao
