= Prockia pentamera =

Scientific classification
- Kingdom: Plantae
- Clade: Tracheophytes
- Clade: Angiosperms
- Clade: Eudicots
- Clade: Rosids
- Order: Malpighiales
- Family: Salicaceae
- Genus: Prockia
- Species: P. pentamera

Binomial name
- Prockia pentamera A.H.Gentry

Species of flowering plant

Prockia pentamera is a species of flowering plant in the family Salicaceae.

The plant is endemic to the department of Tumbes in Peru, and the provinces of Guayas and Loja in Ecuador. It grows in dry forest remnants at elevations of 20–820 m (66–2,690 ft).

Prockia pentamera was first described by Alwyn Howard Gentry in 1988.

== Description ==
Prockia pentamera is a small tree, growing 5–6 m (16–20 ft) tall, with rough, dark brown bark. Its young branches are initially covered in appressed-puberulous hairs but later become mostly glabrescent except at the nodes, and they are lenticellate. The stipules are tiny, linear, and less than 1 mm (0.039 in) long, falling off early, each bearing a pair of thick yellow glands on their lower halves. The ovate to broadly ovate leaves are acute to short-acuminate at the tips and have bases that range from truncate to shallowly and broadly cordate. Membranaceous in texture, the leaves possess 2–4 basal glands near the petiole attachment on the upper surface. The upper leaf surface is mostly glabrous except for small appressed hairs along the midvein, while the lower surface varies from sparsely hirtellous to glabrous, retaining some pubescence in and above the axils of lateral veins. The serrate leaves measure 2.5–15 cm (0.98–5.91 in) in length and 1.3–12 cm (0.51–4.72 in) in width, with five basal veins. Their petioles, 0.5–3.5 cm (0.20–1.38 in), are covered with appressed or erect hairs. The inflorescences consist of 2–3 flowers at the tips of lateral branches, with slender peduncles approximately 5 cm (2.0 in) long and pedicels 0.5–1 cm (0.20–0.39 in) long, both covered in mostly subappressed hairs. The flowers, green when fresh, have 5 sepals densely grayish-tomentose, measuring 10 mm (0.39 in) in length and 3–8 mm (0.12–0.31 in) in width. The 5 narrowly oblong, acute petals are also densely tomentose and roughly the same length as the sepals. Stamens are attached to the receptacle, with glabrous filaments, while the ovary is subglobose and glabrous with a style about 4 mm (0.16 in) long and a distinctly 5-lobed stigma. The fruit of this species has not yet been observed.
