= Finnur Jónsson (bishop) =

Icelandic bishop (1704–1789)

Finnur Jónsson (16 January 1704 – 23 July 1789) was an Icelandic pastor who served as Bishop of Skálholt from 1754 to 1785. He attended the University of Copenhagen and became a pastor at Reykholt in 1732. He was reluctant to become a bishop due to the administrative duties the office entailed. He was also an accomplished scholar. In 1774, he became the first Icelander to receive a Doctor of Theology degree. From 1772 to 1778, he published Historia Ecclesiastica Islandiæ, a four-volume work containing publications of the church in Iceland in Latin.

Finnur's son, Hannes Finnsson, succeeded his father as Bishop of Skálholt, having been ordained a bishop in 1777. Finnur's wife was Guðríður Gísladóttir (1707–1766).

== See also ==
- List of Skálholt bishops
