= Jón Benjamínsson =

Jón Benjamínsson (1774 – 21 July 1843) was an Icelandic police officer. In 1814 he became the first Icelander to hold the position of police officer in the country, a position he held for a year.
