= Prockia krusei =

Conservation status
- Critically Endangered (IUCN 3.1)

Scientific classification
- Kingdom: Plantae
- Clade: Tracheophytes
- Clade: Angiosperms
- Clade: Eudicots
- Clade: Rosids
- Order: Malpighiales
- Family: Salicaceae
- Genus: Prockia
- Species: P. krusei

Binomial name
- Prockia krusei J.Jiménez Ram. & Cruz Durán

Species of flowering plant

Prockia krusei is a species of flowering plant in the family Salicaceae.

The plant is endemic to Mexico in the states of Colima, Guerrero, Jalisco, Michoacán, Nayarit and Oaxaca. It occurs primarily within the seasonally dry tropical biome, where it grows in tropical deciduous forests at altitudes of 1,400–1,610 m (4,590–5,280 ft).

Prockia krusei was first described by Jaime Jiménez Ramírez and Ramiro Cruz Durán in 2005.

== Description ==
Prockia krusei is a shrub or small tree, reaching 2–6 m (6 ft 7 in – 19 ft 8 in) in height. It features bisexual, apetalous flowers and a unilocular ovary with strongly intrusive placentas, which develop into berries.

== Conservation status ==
Prockia krusei is compounded by threats such as deforestation driven by urban expansion, forest fires, and mining activities. The deterioration of its biome has been exacerbated by cattle grazing, intensive logging for agricultural purposes, and human settlement. Unfortunately, there are no current conservation measures in place, and the species is absent from ex situ collections. To ensure the survival of the species, it is imperative to establish sustainable production activities, alternative livelihoods to reduce forest destruction, enforce legal protections, and implement conservation payment schemes. Moreover, enhanced research efforts are needed to gain insights into the population size, distribution, and trends of this species, paving the way for a comprehensive action or recovery plan. Due to its limited EOO and AOO, it is listed as CR by the IUCN Red List.
