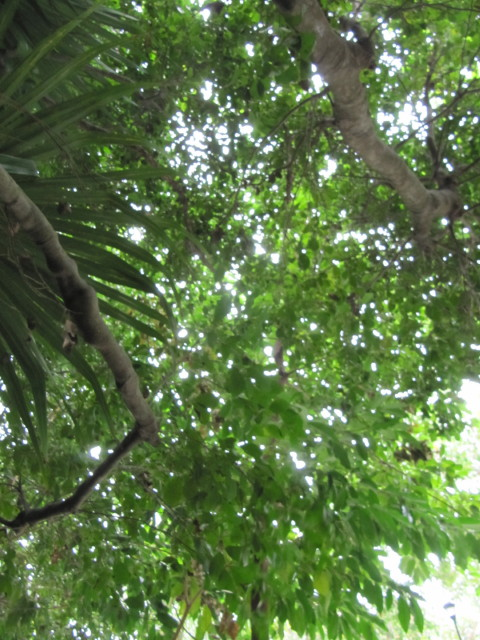
- Talisia olivaeformis

Scientific classification
- Kingdom: Plantae
- Clade: Tracheophytes
- Clade: Angiosperms
- Clade: Eudicots
- Clade: Rosids
- Order: Sapindales
- Family: Sapindaceae
- Subfamily: Sapindoideae
- Genus: Talisia; Aubl.

Species
- See text

= Talisia =

Genus of flowering plants

Talisia is a genus of 52 species of flowering plants in the family Sapindaceae, native to tropical regions of the Americas. The genus is closely related to Melicoccus, with some species sometimes included in that genus.

The species are evergreen trees and shrubs growing to 20 m tall, with pinnate leaves. The flowers are individually inconspicuous, produced in panicles. The fruit is an oval drupe 2–4 cm long containing one or two seeds surrounded by a translucent crisp, juicy layer of fruit pulp and a thin orange or brown skin; in several species the fruit pulp is edible.

Selected species

- Talisia acutifolia
- Talisia angustifolia
- Talisia bullata
- Talisia carinata
- Talisia caudata
- Talisia cerasina
- Talisia chartacea
- Talisia clathrata
- Talisia cerasina
- Talisia coriacea
- Talisia croatii
- Talisia cupularis
- Talisia dasyclada
- Talisia douradoensis
- Talisia equatoriensis
- Talisia esculenta
- Talisia eximia
- Talisia firma
- Talisia floresii
- Talisia furfuracea
- Talisia ghilleana
- Talisia guianensis
- Talisia granulosa
- Talisia hemidasya
- Talisia hexaphylla
- Talisia laevigata
- Talisia lanata
- Talisia longifolia
- Talisia macrophylla
- Talisia marleana
- Talisia megaphylla
- Talisia microphylla
- Talisia mollis
- Talisia morii
- Talisia nervosa
- Talisia obovata
- Talisia oedipoda
- Talisia pachycarpa
- Talisia parviflora
- Talisia pilosula
- Talisia pinnata
- Talisia praealta
- Talisia princeps
- Talisia retusa
- Talisia setigera
- Talisia simaboides
- Talisia squarrosa
- Talisia stricta
- Talisia subalbens
- Talisia sylvatica
- Talisia velutina
- Talisia veraluciana
