= Marta María Stephensen =

Icelandic writer

Marta María Stephensen (17 November 1770 – 1805), was an Icelandic writer.

She was married to Stefán Stephensen, the county governor of Vesturamt from 1790 to 1806. She published a cookery book in 1800, and is regarded as the first published female author in Iceland.

== Sources ==
- Einfaldt Matreidslu Vasa-Qver, fyrir heldri manna Húss-freyjur / Utgefid af Frú Assessorinnu Mørtu Maríu Stephensen. Leirárgörðum við Leirá, 1800.
- Saga Jóns Espólíns hins fróða. Kaupmannahöfn, 1895.
- Hallgerður Gísladóttir. Íslensk matarhefð. Mál og menning, Reykjavík, 1999.
- Pocket Cookbook. Einfalt matreiðsluvasakver (1800, first published Icelandic cookbook) (Digital)
