= Bharath Sriraman =

Indian-born mathematician (born 1971)

- Born: 1971 (age 54–55); Bangalore, India
- Education: University of Alaska Fairbanks, Northern Illinois University
- Awards: 2002 NAGC Distinguished Brief of the Year; SSMA 2007 Early Scholar; 2009 NIU Golden Alumni; 2016 UM Distinguished Scholar
- Scientific career
- Fields: mathematics,mathematics education; creativity,philosophy of mathematics
- Workplaces: The University of Montana
- Doctoral advisor: Robert Wheeler

Bharath Sriraman (born 1971) is an Indian-born Professor of Mathematical Sciences at the University of Montana–Missoula and an academic editor, known for his contributions to the interdisciplinarity of mathematics-science-arts; visual, experimental and computational approaches to mathematics, theory development and international overviews in mathematics education,. He has also contributed to creativity research, the history and philosophy of mathematics, and gifted education.

== Education and honors ==
Bharath Sriraman attended St. Michael’s School (founded by the Jesuits of St. Michael's Church, Mumbai) from 1976-87. He graduated with a B.S. in mathematics from the University of Alaska Fairbanks in 1995. He obtained his M.S in Mathematics in 1999 followed by a PhD in Mathematical Sciences in 2002 both from Northern Illinois University under the functional analyst Robert Wheeler. In 2009, Northern Illinois University named him as one of 50 "Golden alumni" in the last 50 years for his significant contributions to research in mathematics education, gifted education and interdisciplinary research at the intersection of mathematics-science-arts. He previously received the School Science and Mathematics Association Early Scholar Award in 2007. In 2016 he was the recipient of the University of Montana Distinguished Scholar Award. At the 15th International Congress on Mathematical Education (2024) in Sydney, he chaired the plenary panel on What counts as evidence in mathematics education

== Academic and editorial work ==
Sriraman is the founder and editor-in-chief of The Mathematics Enthusiast, an independent open access journal hosted by University of Montana. He is the co-founder/co-editor-in-chief of two series with Springer Science+Business Media namely Advances in Mathematics Education and Creativity Theory and Action in Education. In addition to editing he is a prolific scholar with over 300 publications to date in numerous areas of research, and held numerous visiting professorships including those as International Fulbright Specialist at institutions in Nordic countries, Eurasia and South America. He also holds an adjunct appointment in the department of Central and Southwest-Asian Studies at the University of Montana

== Bibliography of Edited Works (selection) ==
=== Mathematics ===
- Sriraman, Bharath, ed. (2021). Handbook of the Mathematics of the Arts and Sciences. Springerlink. doi:10.1007/978-3-319-70658-0. ISBN 978-3-319-70658-0. S2CID 243647817.
- Sriraman, Bharath, ed. (2026). Handbook of Visual, Experimental and Computational Mathematics: Bridges through Data. Springerlink. doi:10.1007/978-3-030-93954-0. ISBN 978-3-030-93954-0.
- Sriraman, Bharath, ed. (2024). Handbook of the History and Philosophy of Mathematical Practice. SpringerNature. doi:10.1007/978-3-031-40846-5. ISBN 978-3-031-40845-8. S2CID 241668074.
- Sriraman, Bharath, ed. (2017). Humanizing Mathematics and its Philosophy: Essays celebrating the 90th birthday of Reuben Hersh. Springerlink. doi:10.1007/978-3-319-61231-7. ISBN 978-3-319-61230-0.

=== Creativity ===
- Sriraman, B., &Lee, K. (2011): The Elements of Creativity and Giftedness in Mathematics. Sense Publishers, The Netherlands.ISBN 978-94-6091-439-3
- Beghetto, R. &Sriraman, B. (2017): Creative Contradictions in Education: Cross disciplinary paradoxes and perspectives, Springer International, Switzerland, ISBN 978-3-319-21924-0

=== Mathematics and Gifted Education ===
- Sriraman, B., English, L. (2010): Theories of Mathematics Education: Seeking New Frontiers, Springer, Berlin, Germany, ISBN 978-3-642-00741-5
- Ambrose, D., Sriraman, B., Cross, T. (2013): The Roeper School: A Model for Holistic Development of High Ability, Sense Publishers, Rotterdam, Netherlands, ISBN 978-9-46209417-8
- Ambrose, D., Sternberg, R., Sriraman, B.(2011): Confronting Dogmatism in Gifted Education, Routledge, New York, USA, ISBN 978-0-41589446-3
