= The Mathematics Enthusiast =

- Discipline: Mathematics; Mathematics education
- Language: English
- Edited by: Bharath Sriraman

Standard abbreviations
- ISO 4: Math. Enthus.

Indexing
- ISSN: 1551-3440

The Mathematics Enthusiast is a triannual peer-reviewed open access academic journal covering undergraduate mathematics, mathematics education, including historical, philosophical, and cross-cultural perspectives on mathematics. It is hosted by ScholarWorks at the University of Montana. The journal was established in 2004 and its founding editor-in-chief is Bharath Sriraman. The journal exists as an independent entity in order to give authors full copyright over their articles, and is not affiliated with any commercial publishing companies.

== Abstracting and indexing ==
The journal is abstracted and indexed in Academic Search Complete, Emerging Sources Citation Index, PsycINFO,, MathSciNet, and Scopus.
