= Reykholt, Southern Iceland =

Reykholt
- village
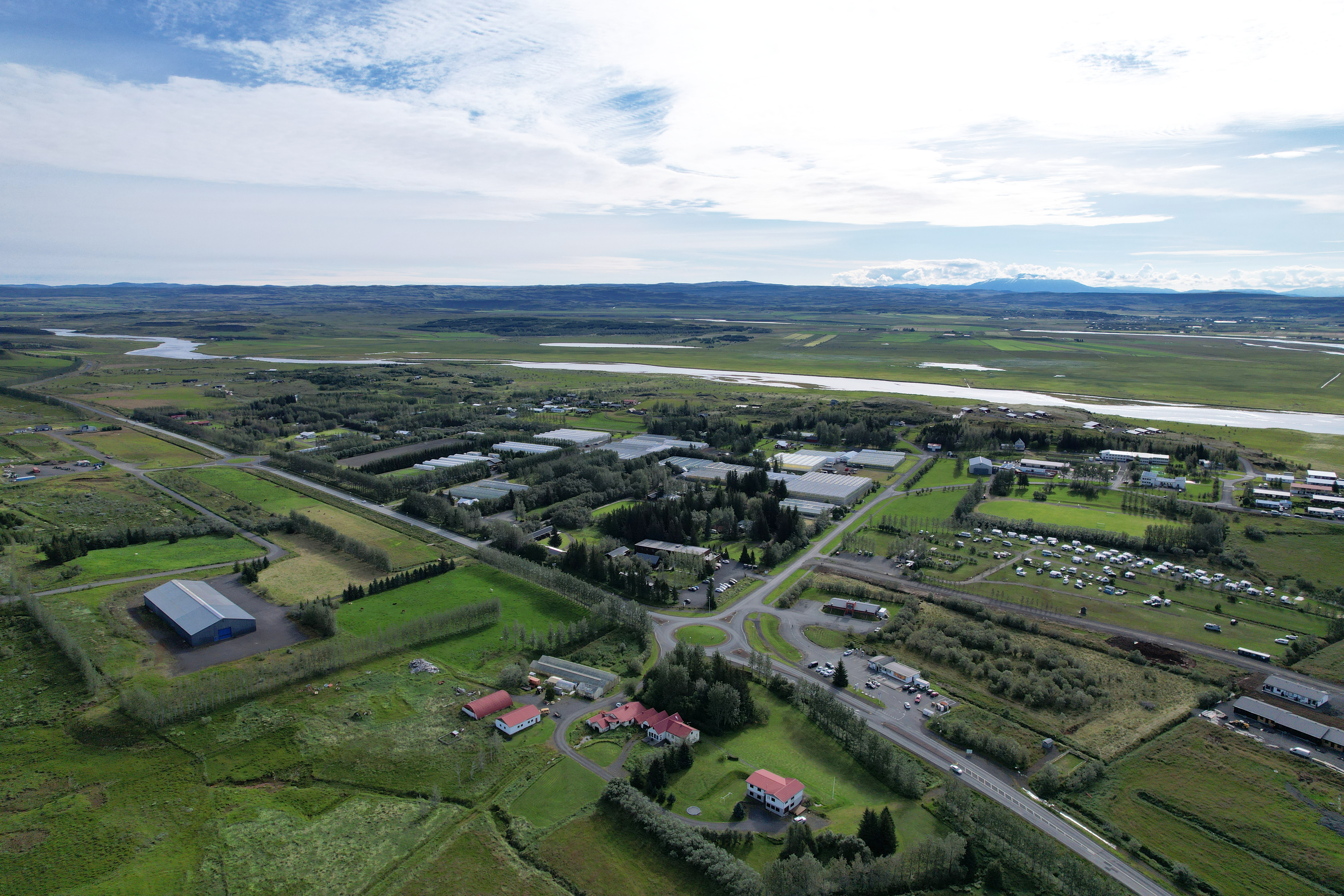

- Location in Iceland
- Coordinates: 64°9′N 19°49′W
- Country: Iceland
- Constituency: South Constituency
- Region: Southern Region
- Municipality: Bláskógabyggð

Population
  - Total: 100
- Time zone: UTC+0 (GMT)

Reykholt (Icelandic: [ˈreikˌhɔl̥t]) is a village in the municipality of Bláskógabyggð in Árnessýsla, Southern Region. It has about 100 inhabitants, hot springs, and greenhouses. It is situated in the south of Iceland not far from Skálholt, Geysir and Gullfoss, and is a stop on the Golden Circle tourist route.
