= Sveinn Pálsson =

Icelandic naturalist (1762–1840)

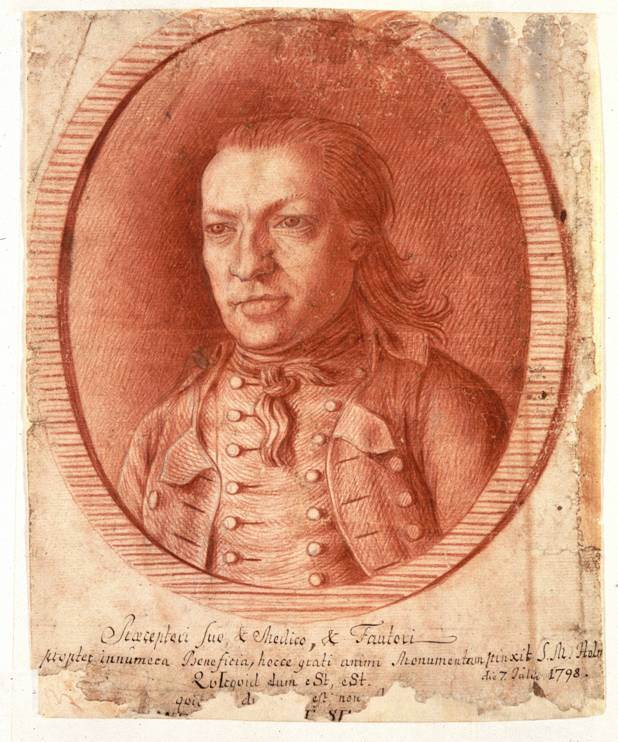
Sveinn Pálsson, 1798

Sveinn Pálsson (25 April 1762 – 24 April 1840) was an Icelandic medical doctor and a naturalist who carried out systematic observations of Icelandic glaciers in the 1790s. He also observed volcanoes and wildlife throughout his homeland. He studied medicine and natural science in Copenhagen (1787–1791) before spending four years travelling around Iceland studying nature. He described his research in Ferðabók ('Travel Journal') and in addition wrote Jöklarit ('Glacier Treatise') and Eldrit ('Volcano Treatise'). Sveinn also wrote extensively about medicine.

== Biography ==
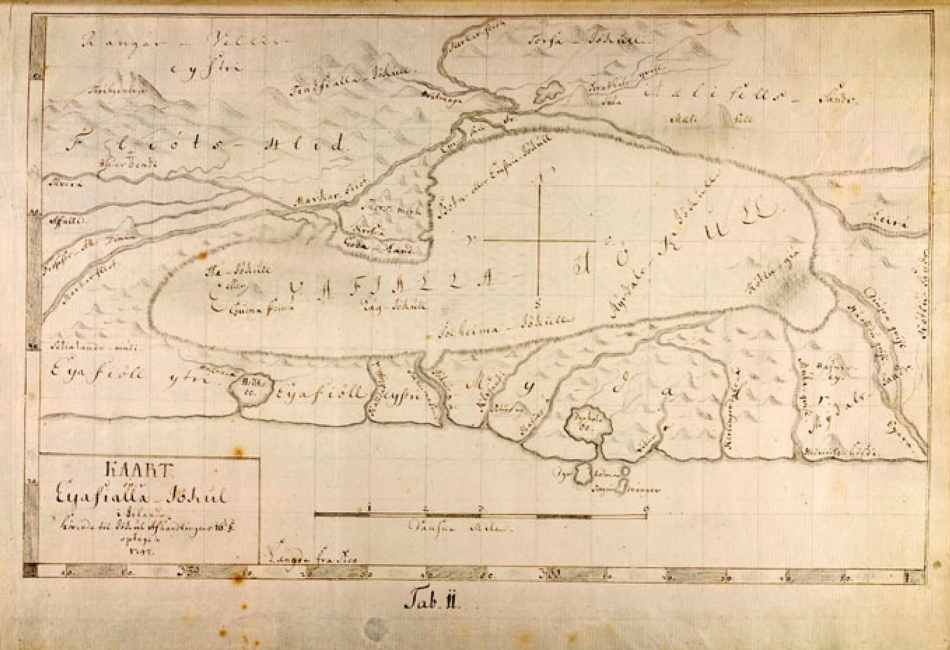
Pálsson's map of Eyjafjallajökull, 1795

Sveinn was the first person to propose the theory that glaciers move under their own weight, like viscous material. He focused on glacial sediments, melt-water rivers and floods, and the effects of subglacial volcanos. His conclusions made significant findings in regards to the formation and dynamics of glaciers. His treatise Draft of a Physical, Geographical, and Historical Description of Icelandic Ice Mountains on the Basis of a Journey to the Most Prominent of Them in 1792–1794 was submitted to the Naturhistorieselskabet in Denmark in 1795, where it languished for almost a century. Not until the 1880s was the Danish manuscript published in part in Oslo, Norway; in 1945 it was published in its entirety in Icelandic by glaciologist Jón Eyþórsson. Due to its isolated location, Iceland remained a remote location for geological investigation until the 20th century.

During his research, Sveinn observed that glaciers move by creeping in a way analogous to the flow of pitch. From the top of Öræfajökull, which he was first to climb as far as is known, he described the Kvíárjökull (Hrútárjökull) glacier in his 1794 work in Jöklarit: "The surface appeared to be covered with curved stripes which lay across the glacier, especially up near the main glacier, and the arch of the curves pointed towards the lowland, just as though the descending glacier had flowed down half-melted or as thick, viscous material. Could this be proof that ice, without actually melting, behaves as a liquid to some extent, like some types of resin?" In Eldrit, Sveinn was the first person to describe the volcanic belt, which lies across Iceland from southwest to northeast. He was also first to find gabbro in Iceland.

== Personal life ==
Sveinn Pálsson served as physician for southern Iceland from 1799 to 1833. His district stretched from Árnessýsla to Skeiðarár Sandur, including the Westman Islands, and was difficult to cross owing to the many unbridged rivers. Doctors were very poorly paid in those days so, to support his family, Sveinn also fished at sea from a row boat and farmed. His wife, Þórunn Bjarnadóttir, was hardworking and took charge of the farm when Sveinn was away. They had 15 children, seven of whom lived to adulthood, so it was a large household. Sveinn lived most of his life at Suður-Vík in Mýrdalur. In 1840, he was laid to rest in the old churchyard at Reynir near Vík.
