= Hrappsey =

Island in Iceland

Coordinates: 65°07′05″N 22°35′50″W

Hrappsey is an island in the Dalabyggð municipality in Iceland. A printing house operated on the island between 1773 and 1794.
