= Patrick Browne (physician) =

Irish physician and botanist

Patrick Browne (1720–1790) was an Irish physician and botanist.

== Career ==
Brownie was born in Woodstock, County Mayo in 1720, sent to relatives on Antigua in 1737 and returned to Europe due to ill health after two years. He studied medicine, natural history and especially botany at Reims, Paris, and Leyden, qualifying in 1743. He worked as a physician at St. Thomas's Hospital, London, visited Barbados, Montserrat, Antigua, and St. Kitts in the West Indies and settled as physician in Jamaica in 1746.

He corresponded with the botanist Carl Linnaeus, among whose papers were found fragments of articles on venereal diseases and yaws by Browne.

His major work, The Civil and Natural History of Jamaica (1756), illustrated by the botanic artist Georg Dionysius Ehret, contains new names for 104 genera.

He retired to Rushbrook, near Claremorris, County Mayo in 1771.

== Other sources ==
- Nelson, E. C. Huntia 11 (1): 5-16. Hunt Institute for Botanical Documentation, Carnegie Mellon University.
- Nelson, E. C., & Walshe, W. F. (1995). Flowers of Mayo.
- Ricorso
- National Centre for Biotechnology Information,
- The Civil and Natural History of Jamaica. In Three Parts. (1756) Archive.org: Full online version, including 50 plates.
