= Christian Leberecht von Prøck =

- Born: Christian Leberecht von Prøck; 1718; Denmark
- Died: 4 September 1780 (aged 61–62); Copenhagen, Denmark
- Military career
- Allegiance: Denmark-Norway
- Service years: 1756–1766
- Rank: Governor-General

Christian Leberecht von Prøck (1718 – 4 September 1780) was a Danish baron. He served as Governor-General of the Danish West Indies colonies from 1756 to 1766. He was the enslaver of Gustav Badin, and has been credited with bringing him to Denmark. In 1768, Pröck became a diocese commander over Iceland and the Faroe Islands. He died on 4 September 1780 in Copenhagen. The plant genus Prockia is named after him.

== Botany ==
In 1759, Patrick Browne ex Carl Linnaeus published Prockia, a genus of flowering plants from Central America, and South America, in the willow family, Salicaceae. Then in 1886, botanist Baill. published Prockiopsis, a genus of flowering plants from Madagascar, belonging to the family Achariaceae and both genera were named in Christian Leberecht von Prøck's honour.
