= Lauritz Andreas Thodal =

Norwegian civil servant

Lauritz Andreas Thodal (c. 1718 – 29 May 1808) was a Norwegian civil servant who was governor of Iceland from 1770 to 1785 and was generally regarded as one of the most competent civil servants sent to Iceland.

== Early life ==
Thodal was born at Selnæs in Lurøy and was the son of Anders Christensen, a citizen of Trondheim, and his wife Else Larsdatter. In 1751, he became secretary of a committee tasked with cleaning up the borders between Norway and Sweden, measuring them out and marking them. The borders are enormously long and in most places in the wilderness, so this was a huge task that took more than fourteen years. Thodal seems to have been the most active of the committee members and earned a very good reputation. He was sent to Stockholm and Saint Petersburg in 1756 on behalf of the committee, and was then given the title of chancellor and the promise of a prestigious and remunerated office when the committee's work ended.
