= 1847 in Iceland =

- Decades: 1820s; 1830s; 1840s; 1850s; 1860s
- See also: Other events in 1847 · Timeline of Icelandic history

Events in the year 1847 in Iceland.

== Incumbents ==
- Monarch: Christian VIII of Denmark
- Governor of Iceland: Matthias Hans Rosenørn

== Births ==
- 28 June: Sveinbjörn Sveinbjörnsson, composer of Lofsöngur (Iceland's national anthem).

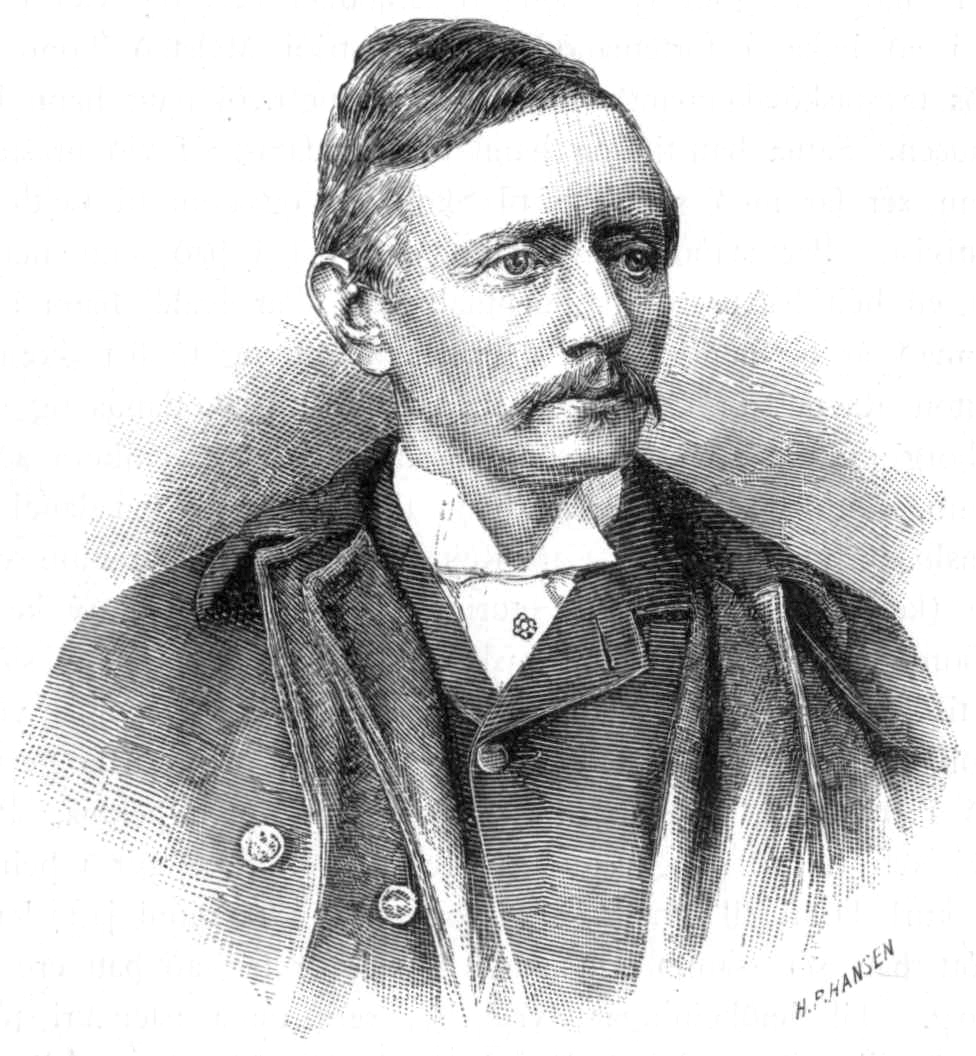
Sveinbjörn Sveinbjörnsson (1847 - 1927).

== Deaths ==
- 24 December: Finnur Magnússon, scholar and archaeologist.
