= Sveinbjörnsson =

Sveinbjörnsson is an Icelandic patronymic surname, literally meaning "son of Sveinbjörn". Notable people with the name include:

- Bjarni Sveinbjörnsson (born 1963), Icelandic footballer
- Haraldur Vignir Sveinbjörnsson (born 1975), Icelandic composer
- Sveinbjörn Sveinbjörnsson (1847–1927), Icelandic composer
- Þórður Sveinbjörnsson (1786–1856), Icelandic politician
