= 1844 in Iceland =

- Decades: 1820s; 1830s; 1840s; 1850s; 1860s
- See also: Other events in 1844 · Timeline of Icelandic history

Events in the year 1844 in Iceland.

== Incumbents ==
- Monarch: Christian VIII of Denmark
- Governor of Iceland: Torkil Abraham Hoppe

== Events ==
- The Althing, Iceland's supreme national parliament is restored by royal decree and moved to Reykjavík, after being made defunct in 1800.
- 1844 Icelandic parliamentary election: The first elections in Iceland's history are held.
- 3 July: The last great auk is reported to have been killed on Eldey.
