= 1856 in Iceland =

- Decades: 1830s; 1840s; 1850s; 1860s; 1870s
- See also: Other events of 1856; Timeline of Icelandic history

Events in the year 1856 in Iceland.

== Incumbents ==
- Monarch: Frederick VII of Denmark
- Council President of Denmark: Peter Georg Bang (until 18 October); Carl Christian Hall onwards
- Governor of Iceland: Jørgen Ditlev Trampe

== Births ==
- 27 September − Bríet Bjarnhéðinsdóttir, women's rights advocate.
- 19 October − Elín Briem, teacher and writer.
- 26 October − Baldwin Baldwinson, Icelandic born Canadian politician.

== Deaths ==
- 20 February − Þórður Sveinbjörnsson, politician.
