= 1851 in Iceland =

- Decades: 1830s; 1840s; 1850s; 1860s; 1870s
- See also: Other events in 1851 · Timeline of Icelandic history

Events in the year 1851 in Iceland.

== Incumbents ==
- Monarch: Frederick VII of Denmark
- Prime Minister of Denmark: Adam Wilhelm Moltke
- Governor of Iceland: Jørgen Ditlev Trampe

== Events ==
- National Assembly of 1851
- The first Mormons in Iceland, Thorarinn Thorason (or Hafliðason) and Guðmundur Guðmundsson were baptized in 1851 under the direction of Erastus Snow.

== Births ==
- 1 June − Þorgils gjallandi, author

== Deaths ==
- 18 October − Brynjólfur Pétursson, lawyer
