= 1843 in Iceland =

- Decades: 1820s; 1830s; 1840s; 1850s; 1860s
- See also: Other events in 1843 · Timeline of Icelandic history

Events in the year 1843 in Iceland.

== Incumbents ==
- Monarch: Christian VIII of Denmark
- Governor of Iceland: Torkil Abraham Hoppe

== Events ==
- 8 March: A royal decree providing for the establishment of a new Althing was issued, with the country's first elections being held the following year.
- Fjölnir, the Icelandic-language journal published annually in Copenhagen is published again after a hiatus.
