= 1842 in Iceland =

- Decades: 1820s; 1830s; 1840s; 1850s; 1860s
- See also: Other events in 1842 · Timeline of Icelandic history

Events in the year 1842 in Iceland.

== Incumbents ==
- Monarch: Christian VIII of Denmark
- Governor of Iceland: Torkil Abraham Hoppe

== Events ==
- Linguistic purism in Icelandic: Jónas Hallgrímsson publishes a translation of a textbook on astronomy (Stjörnufræði) which became exemplary for later translations of scientific literature.

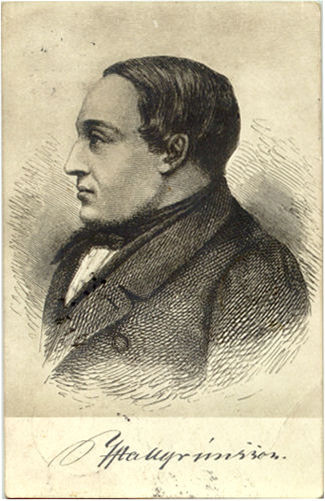
Jónas Hallgrímsson
