= 1854 in Iceland =

- Decades: 1830s; 1840s; 1850s; 1860s; 1870s
- See also: Other events of 1854; Timeline of Icelandic history

Events in the year 1854 in Iceland.

== Incumbents ==
- Monarch: Frederick VII of Denmark
- Prime Minister of Denmark: Anders Sandøe Ørsted (until 12 December); Peter Georg Bang onwards
- Governor of Iceland: Jørgen Ditlev Trampe

=== Events ===
- The Danish government relaxed the trade ban that had been imposed in 1602, and Iceland gradually began to rejoin Western Europe economically and socially.

== Births ==
- 4 June − Pétur J. Thorsteinsson, merchant.
