= 1849 in Iceland =

- Decades: 1820s; 1830s; 1840s; 1850s; 1860s
- See also: Other events in 1849 · Timeline of Icelandic history

Events in the year 1849 in Iceland.

== Incumbents ==
- Monarch: Frederick VII of Denmark
- Prime Minister of Denmark: Adam Wilhelm Moltke
- Governor of Iceland: Matthias Hans Rosenørn

== Events ==
- Langabúð, one of Iceland's oldest buildings is completed in Djúpivogur.

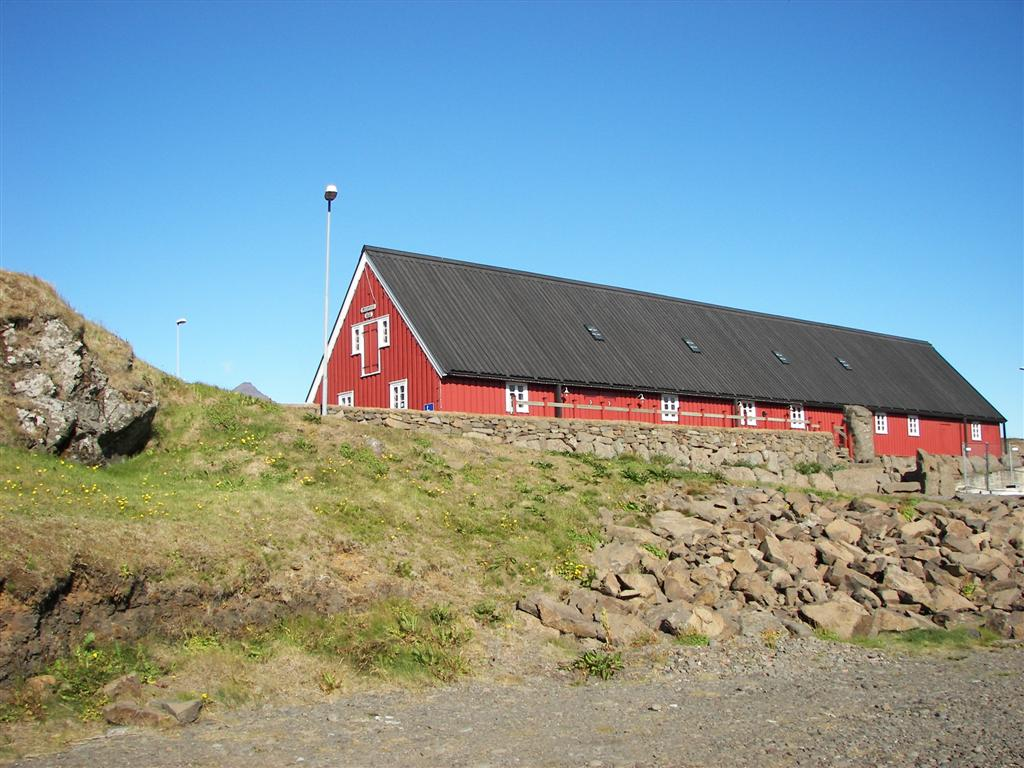
Langabúð
