= 1853 in Iceland =

- Decades: 1830s; 1840s; 1850s; 1860s; 1870s
- See also: Other events in 1853 · Timeline of Icelandic history

Events in the year 1853 in Iceland.

== Incumbents ==
- Monarch: Frederick VII of Denmark
- Prime Minister of Denmark: Christian Albrecht Bluhme (until 21 April); Anders Sandøe Ørsted onwards
- Governor of Iceland: Jørgen Ditlev Trampe

=== Events ===
- 19 June − Gudmund Gudmundson helped organize the first Church of Latter Day Saints congregation in Iceland in the Westman Islands.

== Births ==
- 3 October − Stephan G. Stephansson, poet.
- 27 November − Guðrún Björnsdóttir, politician.
