= 1855 in Iceland =

- Decades: 1830s; 1840s; 1850s; 1860s; 1870s
- See also: Other events of 1855; Timeline of Icelandic history

Events in the year 1855 in Iceland.

== Incumbents ==
- Monarch: Frederick VII of Denmark
- Council President of Denmark: Peter Georg Bang
- Governor of Iceland: Jørgen Ditlev Trampe

=== Events ===
- The Icelandic Army was re-established by Andreas August von Kohl, the sheriff in Vestmannaeyjar.

== Births ==
- 6 June − Þorvaldur Thoroddsen, geologist and geographer.
- 2 December − Þórhallur Bjarnarson, politician.

== Deaths ==
- Rósa Guðmundsdóttir, poet.
