= 1837 in Iceland =

- Decades: 1810s; 1820s; 1830s; 1840s; 1850s
- See also: Other events in 1837 · Timeline of Icelandic history

Events in the year 1837 in Iceland.

== Incumbents ==
- Monarch: Frederick VI
- Governor of Iceland: Carl Emil Bardenfleth

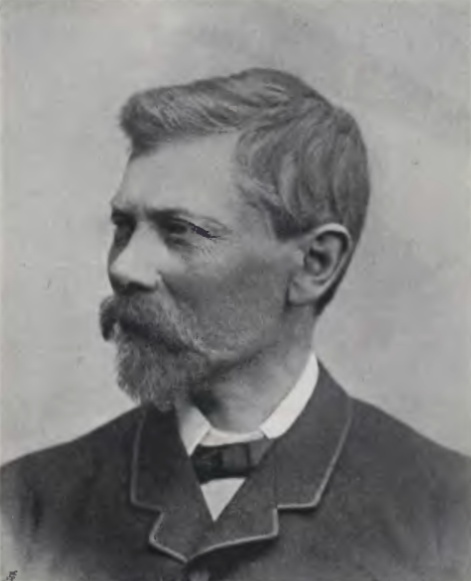
Sigfús Eymundsson

== Births ==
- Sigfús Eymundsson, photographer and bookseller
