= 1850 in Iceland =

- Decades: 1830s; 1840s; 1850s; 1860s; 1870s
- See also: Other events in 1850 · Timeline of Icelandic history

Events in the year 1850 in Iceland.

== Incumbents ==
- Monarch: Frederick VII of Denmark
- Prime Minister of Denmark: Adam Wilhelm Moltke
- Governor of Iceland: Jørgen Ditlev Trampe

== Events ==
- Iceland became the first country to grant equal rights to men and women.

== Births ==
- 14 July: Björn M. Ólsen, scholar and politician.
