= 1848 in Iceland =

- Decades: 1820s; 1830s; 1840s; 1850s; 1860s
- See also: Other events in 1848 · Timeline of Icelandic history

Events in the year 1848 in Iceland.

== Incumbents ==
- Monarch: Christian VIII of Denmark (until 20 January); Frederick VII of Denmark onwards
- Prime Minister of Denmark: Adam Wilhelm Moltke
- Governor of Iceland: Matthias Hans Rosenørn

== Events ==
- 20 January: Christian VIII of Denmark dies, Frederick VII of Denmark assumes the position of monarch.
- 22 March: Adam Wilhelm Moltke is appointed the first Prime Minister of Denmark.

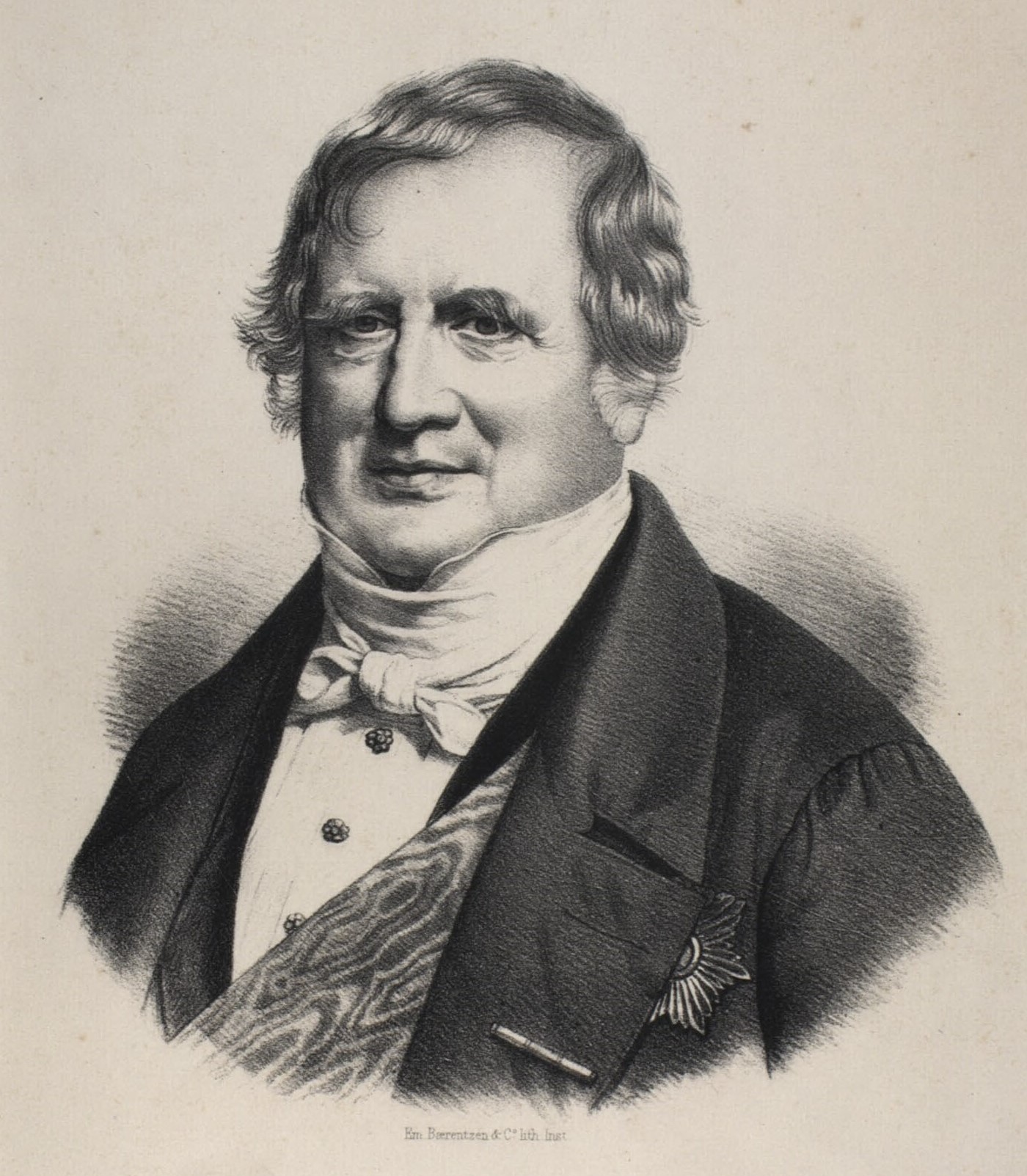
Adam Wilhelm Moltke, Denmark's first Prime Minister

== Births ==
- 1 February: Valdimar Briem, poet, prelate, hymnwriter and translator.
- 5 February: Nicoline Weywadt, Iceland's first female photographer.
