= 1852 in Iceland =

- Decades: 1830s; 1840s; 1850s; 1860s; 1870s
- See also: Other events in 1852 · Timeline of Icelandic history

Events in the year 1852 in Iceland.

== Incumbents ==
- Monarch: Frederick VII of Denmark
- Prime Minister of Denmark: Adam Wilhelm Moltke (until 27 January); Christian Albrecht Bluhme onwards
- Governor of Iceland: Jørgen Ditlev Trampe

== Births ==
- 4 March − Kristján Jónsson, politician.

== Deaths ==
- 17 August − Sveinbjörn Egilsson, theologian.
