= 1858 in Iceland =

- Decades: 1830s; 1840s; 1850s; 1860s; 1870s
- See also: Other events of 1858; Timeline of Icelandic history

Events in the year 1858 in Iceland.

== Incumbents ==
- Monarch: Frederick VII of Denmark
- Council President of Denmark: Carl Christian Hall
- Governor of Iceland: Jørgen Ditlev Trampe

== Events ==
- German historian Konrad von Maurer visited Iceland.

== Births ==
- 29 May − Finnur Jónsson, philologist.
- Þorsteinn Erlingsson, poet.
