= 1845 in Iceland =

- Decades: 1820s; 1830s; 1840s; 1850s; 1860s
- See also: Other events in 1845 · Timeline of Icelandic history

Events in the year 1845 in Iceland.

== Incumbents ==
- Monarch: Christian VIII of Denmark
- Governor of Iceland: Torkil Abraham Hoppe

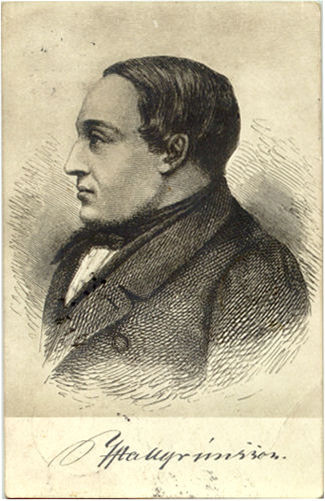
Portrait of Jónas Hallgrímsson

== Events ==
- 1 July: The first Consultative assembly finally met on 1 July 1845 in Reykjavík.

== Births ==
- 2 February: Torfhildur Þorsteinsdóttir, author.

== Deaths ==
- 26 May: Jónas Hallgrímsson, poet and writer.
- 14 June: Steingrímur Jónsson, prelate, bishop of Iceland.
