= 1859 in Iceland =

- Decades: 1830s; 1840s; 1850s; 1860s; 1870s
- See also: Other events of 1859; Timeline of Icelandic history

Events in the year 1859 in Iceland.

== Incumbents ==
- Monarch: Frederick VII of Denmark
- Council President of Denmark: ) Carl Christian Hall (until 2 December 1859); Carl Edvard Rotwitt onwards
- Governor of Iceland: Jørgen Ditlev Trampe

== Events ==
- The Ørnen Corvette begins patrolling Icelandic waters.

== Births ==
- 6 January − Skúli Thoroddsen, judge and politician.
- 16 January − Jón Magnússon, politician, and prime minister of Iceland.
- 6 December − Einar Hjörleifsson Kvaran, novelist, poet, playwright.
