= 1846 in Iceland =

- Decades: 1820s; 1830s; 1840s; 1850s; 1860s
- See also: Other events in 1846 · Timeline of Icelandic history

Events in the year 1846 in Iceland.

== Incumbents ==
- Monarch: Christian VIII of Denmark
- Governor of Iceland: Torkil Abraham Hoppe

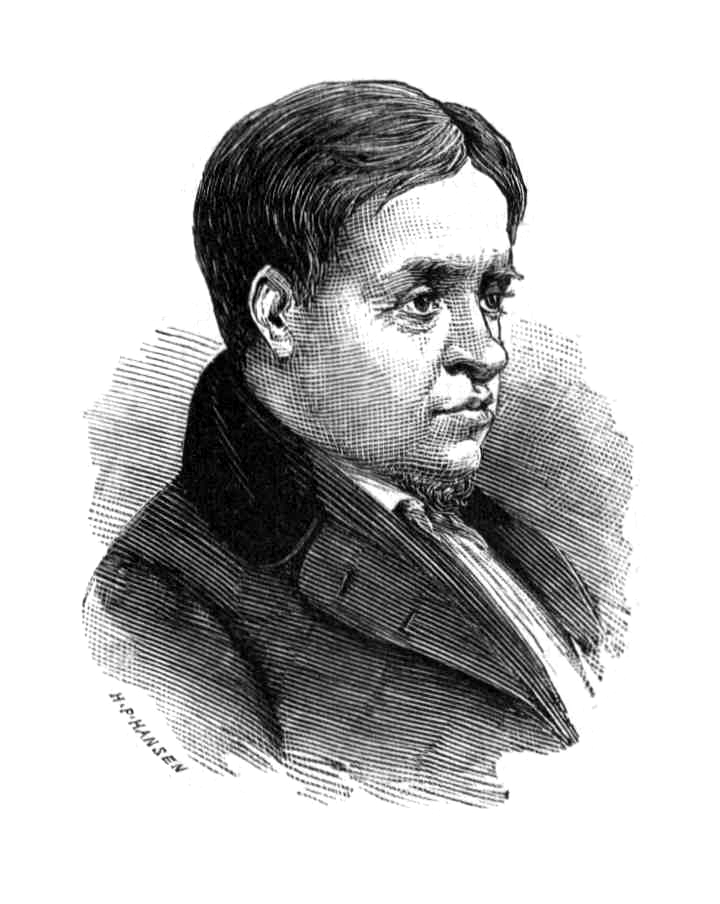
Portrait of Sigurður Breiðfjörð (1798 – 1846)

== Events ==
- Helgi G. Thordersen becomes the third Bishop of Iceland, following the death of Steingrímur Jónsson the previous year.

== Births ==
- 8 October: Björn Jónsson, politician.

== Deaths ==
- 4 March: Sigurður Breiðfjörð, poet.
- 23 June: Björn Blöndal, politician.
