= 1841 in Iceland =

- Decades: 1820s; 1830s; 1840s; 1850s; 1860s
- See also: Other events in 1841 · Timeline of Icelandic history

Events in the year 1841 in Iceland.

== Incumbents ==
- Monarch: Christian VIII of Denmark
- Governor of Iceland: Torkil Abraham Hoppe

== Events ==
- Jón Sigurðsson's annual magazine Ný félagsrit (New Association Writings) begins publication. The magazine was used to communicate with the Icelandic people from his home in Denmark.

== Births ==
- 5 April: Hallgrímur Sveinsson, prelate (Bishop of Iceland)

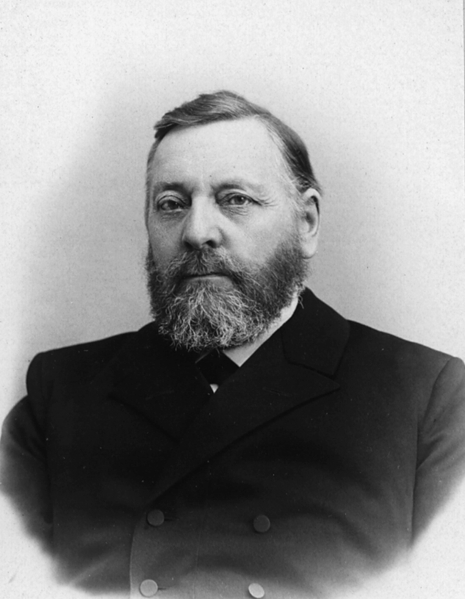
Hallgrímur Sveinsson
