= 1838 in Iceland =

- Decades: 1810s; 1820s; 1830s; 1840s; 1850s
- See also: Other events in 1838 · Timeline of Icelandic history

Events in the year 1838 in Iceland.

== Incumbents ==
- Monarch: Frederick VI
- Governor of Iceland: Carl Emil Bardenfleth

== Events ==
- Hólavallagarður cemetery is consecrated.

Gravestones at Hólavallagarður cemetery

== Deaths ==
- 9 November: Hannes Bjarnason, poet
