= 1839 in Iceland =

- Decades: 1810s; 1820s; 1830s; 1840s; 1850s
- See also: Other events in 1839 · Timeline of Icelandic history

Events in the year 1839 in Iceland.

== Incumbents ==
- Monarch: Frederick VI (until 3 December); Christian VIII onwards
- Governor of Iceland: Carl Emil Bardenfleth

== Events ==
- 3 December: Frederick VI, king of Denmark (and Iceland) dies and is succeeded by his half-first cousin Christian VIII.
- Icelandic poet Bjarni Thorarensen publishes Íslands minni

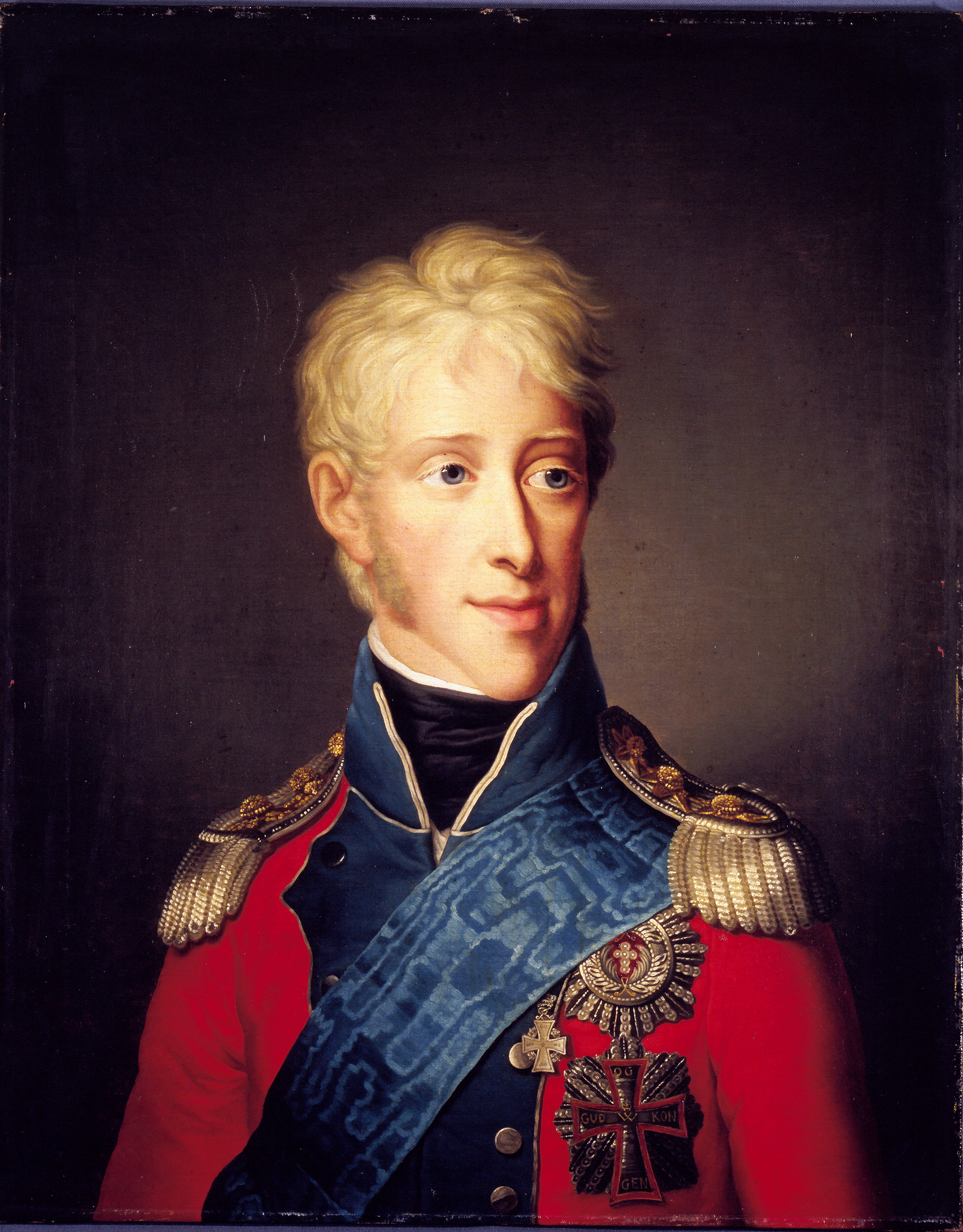
Frederick VI of Denmark
