= Sveinbjörn =

Sveinbjörn [ˈsveinˌpjœ(r)tn̥] (or Sveinbjorn) is a masculine Icelandic given name.

Notable people with the name include:

- Sveinbjörn Beinteinsson (1924–1993), Icelandic religious leader and singer
- Sveinbjörn Claessen (born 1986), Icelandic basketball player and coach
- Sveinbjörn Egilsson (1791–1852), Icelandic poet
- Sveinbjörn Hákonarson (born 1957), Icelandic footballer
- Sveinbjorn Johnson (1883–1946), American lawyer and judge
- Sveinbjörn Sveinbjörnsson (1847–1927), Icelandic composer
