= 1840 in Iceland =

- Decades: 1820s; 1830s; 1840s; 1850s; 1860s
- See also: Other events in 1840 · Timeline of Icelandic history

Events in the year 1840 in Iceland.

== Incumbents ==
- Monarch: Christian VIII of Denmark
- Governor of Iceland: Carl Emil Bardenfleth

== Events ==
- The largest recorded surface area of the Langjökull ice gap was recorded.

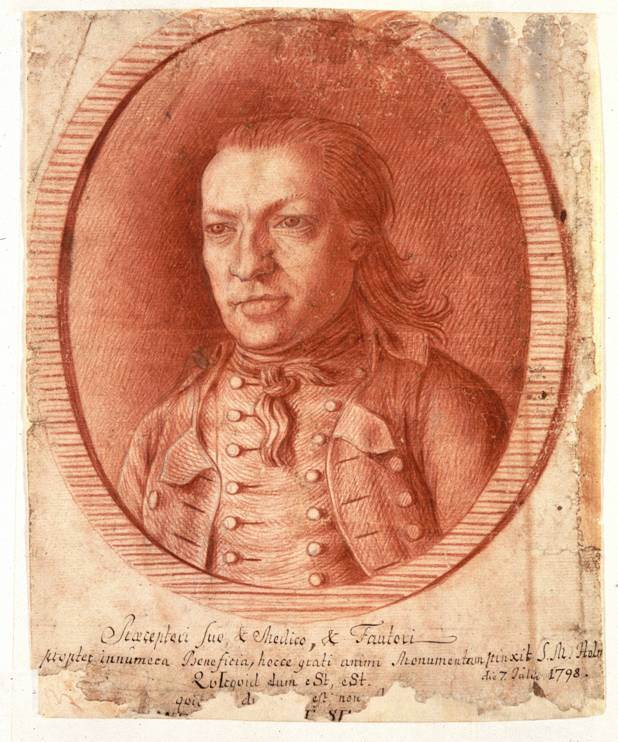
Sveinn Pálsson, 1798

== Deaths ==
- 24 April: Sveinn Pálsson, physician and naturalist.
