= Sunnanpósturinn =

Sunnanpósturinn was an Icelandic monthly publication published from 1835 to 1838. The publication contained news, announcements, articles, stories and poems. Þórður Sveinbjörnsson was the first editor and later Reverend Árni Helgason took over the position.

The publication replaced Klausturpósturinn (1818–1827), which was the first Icelandic language monthly publication.
