= Klausturpósturinn =

First monthly publication in Icelandic

Klausturpósturinn was the first monthly publication to be published in the Icelandic language, first printed at Beitistaðir in 1818 and then printed in the Viðey printing house from 1819 to 1827. The publication contained domestic and foreign news as well as educational material.

The magazine's circulation was between 500 and 1,000 copies. Each issue was sixteen pages long and printed in Gothic lettering. After its discontinuation, eight years passed before a similar publication was published in Iceland, Sunnanpósturinn.
