= Eymundsson =

Iceland's oldest bookstore

Coordinates: 64°8′50.76″N 21°56′16.82″W

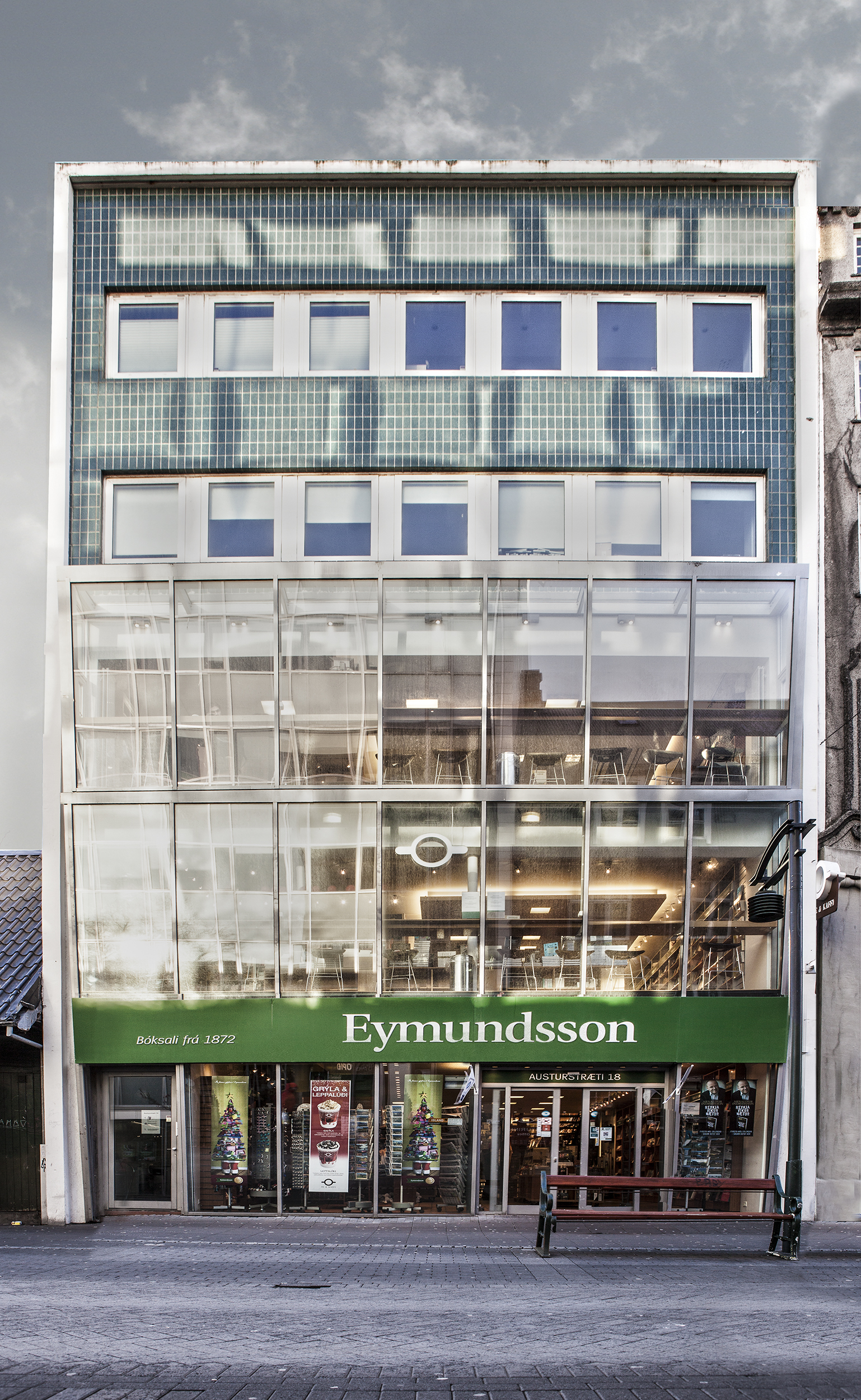
- Company type: Retail
- Founded: 29 November 1872
- Founder: Sigfús Eymundsson
- Headquarters: Reykjavík, Iceland
- Products: books, magazines, stationery, gift items, DVDs, CDs.
- Website: www.eymundsson.is

Eymundsson is Iceland's oldest bookstore, established in 1872. It operates 15 locations around Iceland and offers a wide selection of books, magazines and various gift items. Many of their storefronts also include a coffeehouse. The store offers Iceland's largest selection of foreign books and Icelandic literature in English.

== History ==
Sigfús Eymundsson, a photographer and a bookbinder founded "Bókaverslun Sigfúsar Eymundsson" in 1872. In 1886 Sigfus founded Eymundsson publishing and in coming years he would publish many of Iceland's poets, including Hannes Hafstein and Bólu-Hjálmar. Sigfus was the first to import typewriters and money safes. He was also the first Icelander to publish and sell postcards, using his own photos as material.

In 1920 Eymundsson bought the house on Austurstræti 18. Today Eymundsson's store still stands on this spot, in house built in 1960.
