= Matthías Jochumsson =

Icelandic poet and pastor (1835–1920)

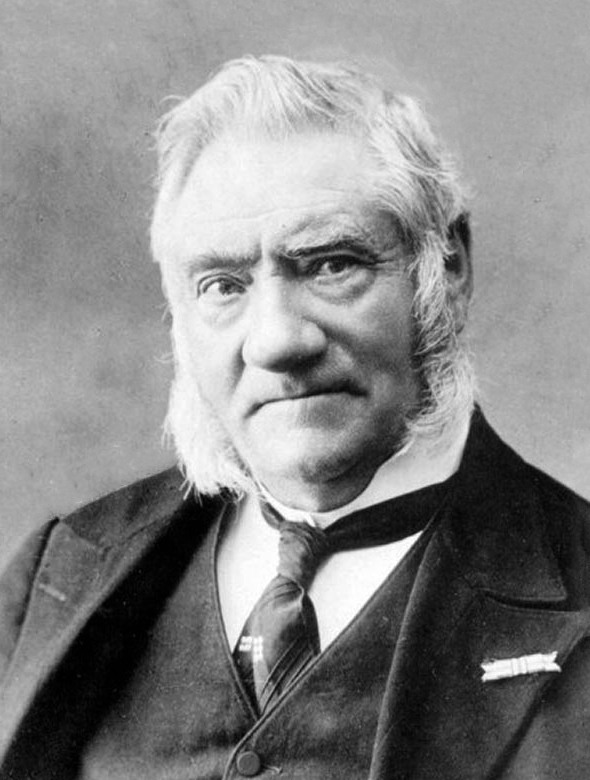
Matthías Jochumsson.

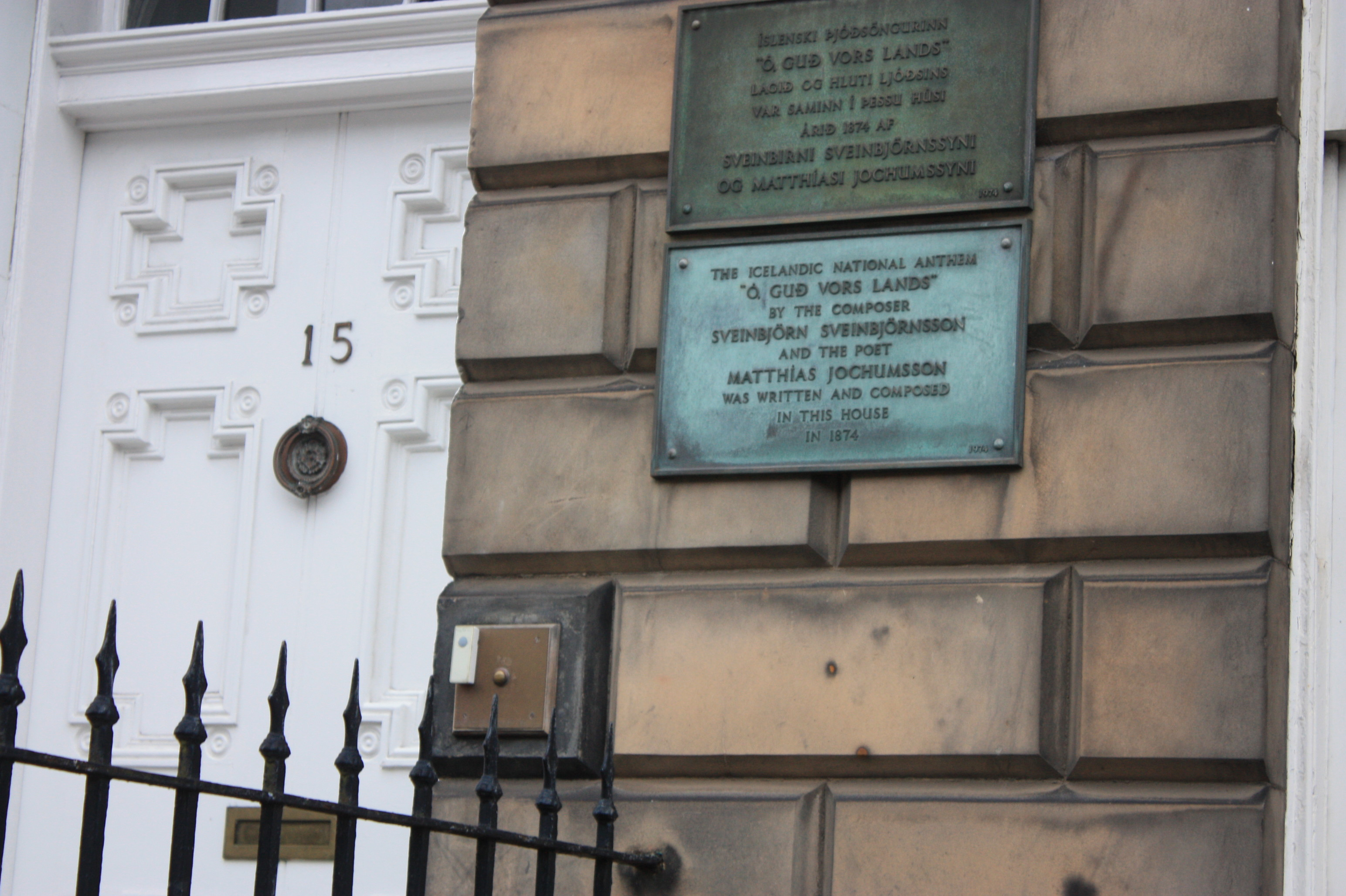
Plaque to Matthias Jochumsson, 15 London Street, Edinburgh

Matthías Jochumsson (11 November 1835 – 18 November 1920) was an Icelandic Lutheran clergyman, poet, playwright, translator and a social reformer. He was a giant in Icelandic cultural life in the decades around 1900. He is best known for his lyrical poetry and for writing the national anthem of Iceland, "Lofsöngur", in 1874. Matthías was, along with writer Torfhildur Hólm, the first Icelandic writers to receive an artist salary from the Althing in 1891.

== Life ==
He was born in Skógar in Þorskafjörður, western Iceland, into a poor family. He studied theology, was ordained priest, and for several years served as pastor at Oddi, S Iceland, and later in Akureyri. He also worked as a newspaper editor and schoolteacher. In his religious views, Matthías leaned towards Unitarianism. Matthías made some trips to the continent to further his education.

Intending to become a businessman, Matthías discovered his passion for languages and literature. In addition to his own works, which include many hymns, Matthías was a prolific translator, especially from English and the Scandinavian languages. His translations from Shakespeare include Hamlet, Macbeth, Othello and Romeo and Juliet.

Matthías's popular comedy, "Skugga-Sveinn", which premiered in 1863, is often hailed as Iceland's first successful performed play.

He wrote "Lofsöngur" with music by Sveinbjörn Sveinbjörnsson in Edinburgh, Scotland in 1874.

Matthías also ran two different newspapers in Iceland and wrote numerous articles on a range of issues.

Guðrún Runólfsdóttir and Matthías married in 1875 and had a total of 11 children, 9 of whom reached adulthood. The latter moved to Akureyri in North Iceland to serve the town's pastorship. In 1903, they had a new house built in the centre called Sigurhæðir (victory hills), where both lived with their extended family household, working on their arts, crafts, culture, and on societal reforms, such as extending women's rights and extending civil rights to all.

Both died in Akureyri, Matthías in 1920 and Guðrún in 1923 and were buried in Akureyri. Their house, Sigurhæðir, is now a culture house, nurturing the arts and culture.
