= National Assembly of 1851 =

Constitutional convention

The National Assembly of 1851 (Icelandic Þjóðfundurinn 1851) was a constitutional convention called to decide the political status of Iceland. The assembly was called in 1848, in the liberal atmosphere following the Spring of Nations. But in 1851, when the assembly finally met, the political tide had turned and conservative forces had regained strength.

The Danes presented a bill to the assembly which would have made the Danish Constitution of 1849 valid in Iceland with an exception concerning the legislative power. Iceland was to get six seats in the Danish Parliament. The delegates prepared an alternative bill, proposing a constitution for a practically independent Iceland in personal union with the Danish king.

Seeing that the delegates would never agree to the Danish bill and believing them to have no authority to discuss the alternative bill, Governor Jørgen Ditlev Trampe decided to dissolve the Assembly. At that point Jón Sigurðsson rose to protest, saying:

And I protest in the name of the King and the people against this procedure, and I reserve for the Assembly the right to complain to the King about this act of illegality.

The official record of the meeting goes on to say: "Then the members of the Assembly rose and most of them said as if with one voice:

"We all protest!"

The constitutional status of Iceland was to remain an unresolved issue for decades to come.
