= Icelandic funeral =

Funerary traditions and practices in Iceland

Icelandic funerals are ceremonies that are largely shaped by the Evangelical Lutheran Church of Iceland, the largest Christian organisation in Iceland. However, customs may vary depending on religious group.

Traditions such as death announcements in national Icelandic newspapers and wakes are common in Iceland. The ritual of embalming is not performed, and the burial process is usually completed within 8 days. Cremations have not been common in Icelandic burial history but are gaining popularity. Christian funeral practises generally follow the Icelandic Church's Liturgy book. The funeral is held in a church and performed by a priest. After the ceremony the coffin is either taken to the cemetery to be buried or the crematorium to be cremated. Once buried, wreaths, flowers and a wooden cross can be placed on the grave. Pagan funeral practises reflect the deep respect for nature. They are usually held outdoors with the ceremony performed by a Gothi. Readings from the Edda or other appropriate literature are included.

Death rituals can also be found in Icelandic folklore in the Sagas of Icelanders. Often special treatment of the corpse was performed as this was believed to prevent the corpse from waking and returning to wreak havoc on the living.

Some cemeteries in Iceland are Fossvogur, Gufunes, Kópavogur, Viðey Island, Hólavallagarður, Sólland.

== Burial culture ==
Iceland converted to Christianity in 1000AD and Iceland's burial culture has been consistent with Europe. Christianity today remains the predominant religion. Contemporary burial culture in Iceland is monopolised and shaped by the Evangelical Lutheran Church of Iceland, the largest Christian organisation in Iceland alongside legal regulations.

Iceland has a population of over 350,000 people. Statistics from 2017 report that 12.2% of the population are immigrants, with the largest immigrant groups being from Poland, Lithuania and the Philippines. Religions that have seen a growth in Iceland include Islam, Buddhism and heathenism. This increase in diversity has begun to change the spiritual landscape of Iceland. These changes are reflected in Icelandic graveyards and funeral practises. Churchyards are the only legal burial grounds but there has been an increase in cremations and Gufunes churchyard has separated burial plots for different religions.

== Rituals and customs ==
=== Treatment of the corpse ===
Until the 1920s it was common practice for the relatives to prepare the body for burial. Nowadays in Iceland, like many modern-day western societies, the process from death to burial is hidden and has moved into the hands of specialists. The undertaking profession in Iceland is almost exclusively in the hands of men. The ritual of embalming is not performed in Iceland and interment is usually performed within 8 days. This has been known to cause problems in cases where foreigners die in Iceland. A suggestion by the rannsóknarsvið of the Landspítali University Hospital (equivalent to a coroner's office) has led to the possibility of having the corpse specially preserved for transfer. This has to be specially authorised for each case and is not necessarily available at all times. Before the funeral, the deceased is laid in a coffin prepared with a pillow and a sheet and it is common to place a flower decoration on the coffin at a funeral.

=== Coffins ===
White painted coffins are the most common. Other options are solid oak, pine, and birch wood chests.

=== Wake ===
Once the body is prepared a tradition called kistulagning often takes place before the funeral. This is a small wake attended by the closest relatives. The body is displayed in the coffin, often with a veil covering the face.

=== Obituary ===
It is customary to announce death through an obituary in a national Icelandic newspaper. Obituaries in Iceland are similar to death notices in European and American newspapers in that they can be about anyone and are written by acquaintances or family of the deceased. These are not written by journalists or reserved for the most important figures in society. One particular newspaper, Morgunblaðið, is often read solely for the obituariese, which is considered a cultural institution.

=== Post-mortem photography ===
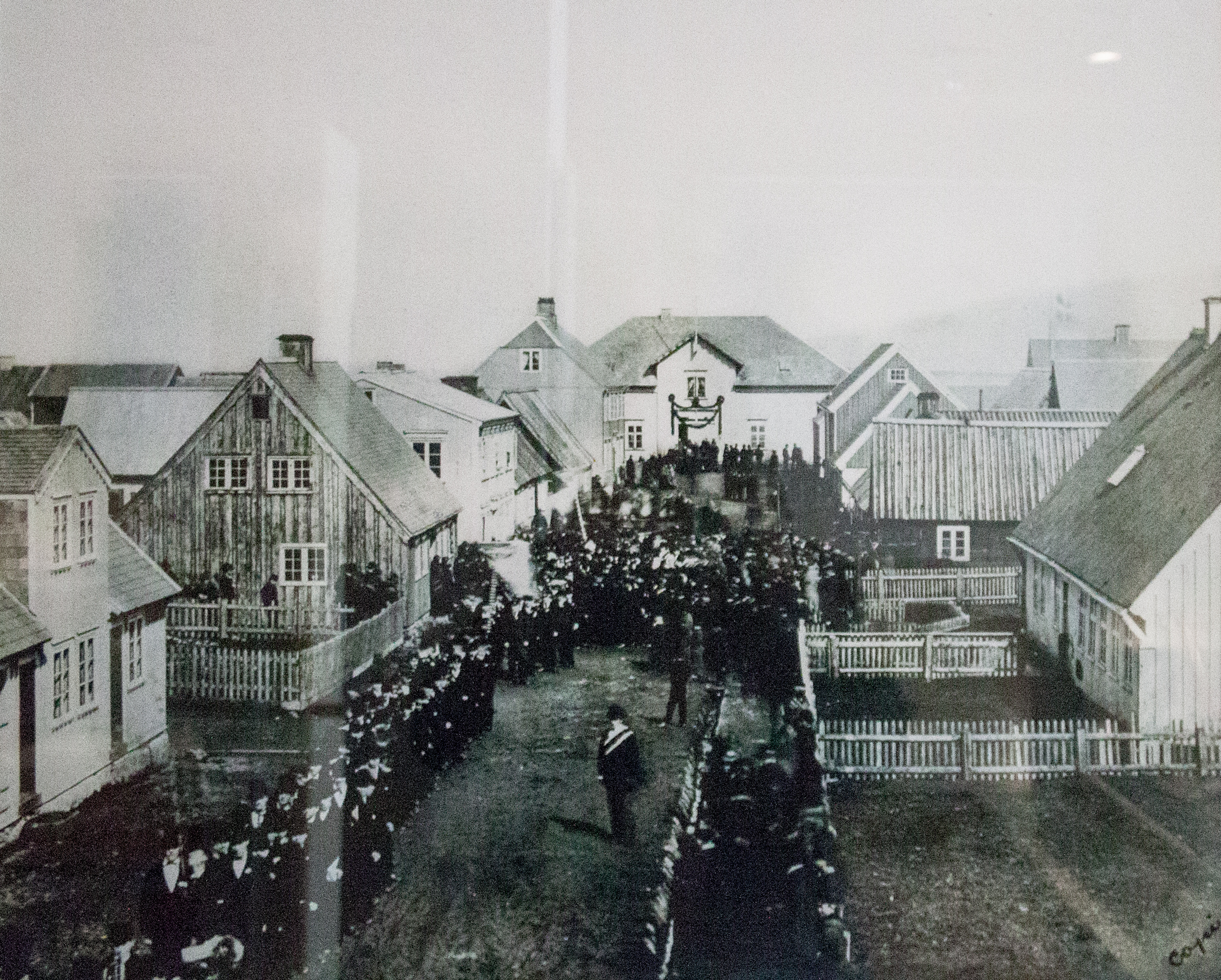
Funeral procession of Jón Sigurdsson in May 1880. He was the leader of the 19th century Icelandic independence movement.

The practice of post mortem photography began in Iceland before the end of the 19th century. From 1900 to 1940 there was a great increase in post mortem photography and funeral procession photography. It is unclear exactly when and how the custom originated. However, it is clear that in Europe and the Nordic countries post mortem photography was practiced at the same time Icelanders were studying photography abroad. In these countries, the practice of post mortem photography dates back many centuries. These funeral procession photographs in Iceland showed that it was common practice for the local population to attend the funeral and wake. After 1940 these types of professional photos and photos of large funeral processions occur less frequently in collections as there was less social involvement in ceremonies of death. The task of photographing the deceased transferred to amateur photographers, relatives, or the general public. Originally the photographs would show the corpse lying in his/her own bed or in the coffin at home during the wake. The body occupies a large amount of the picture frame and flowers or wreaths are placed around the coffin or on the chest of the deceased.

=== Cremations ===
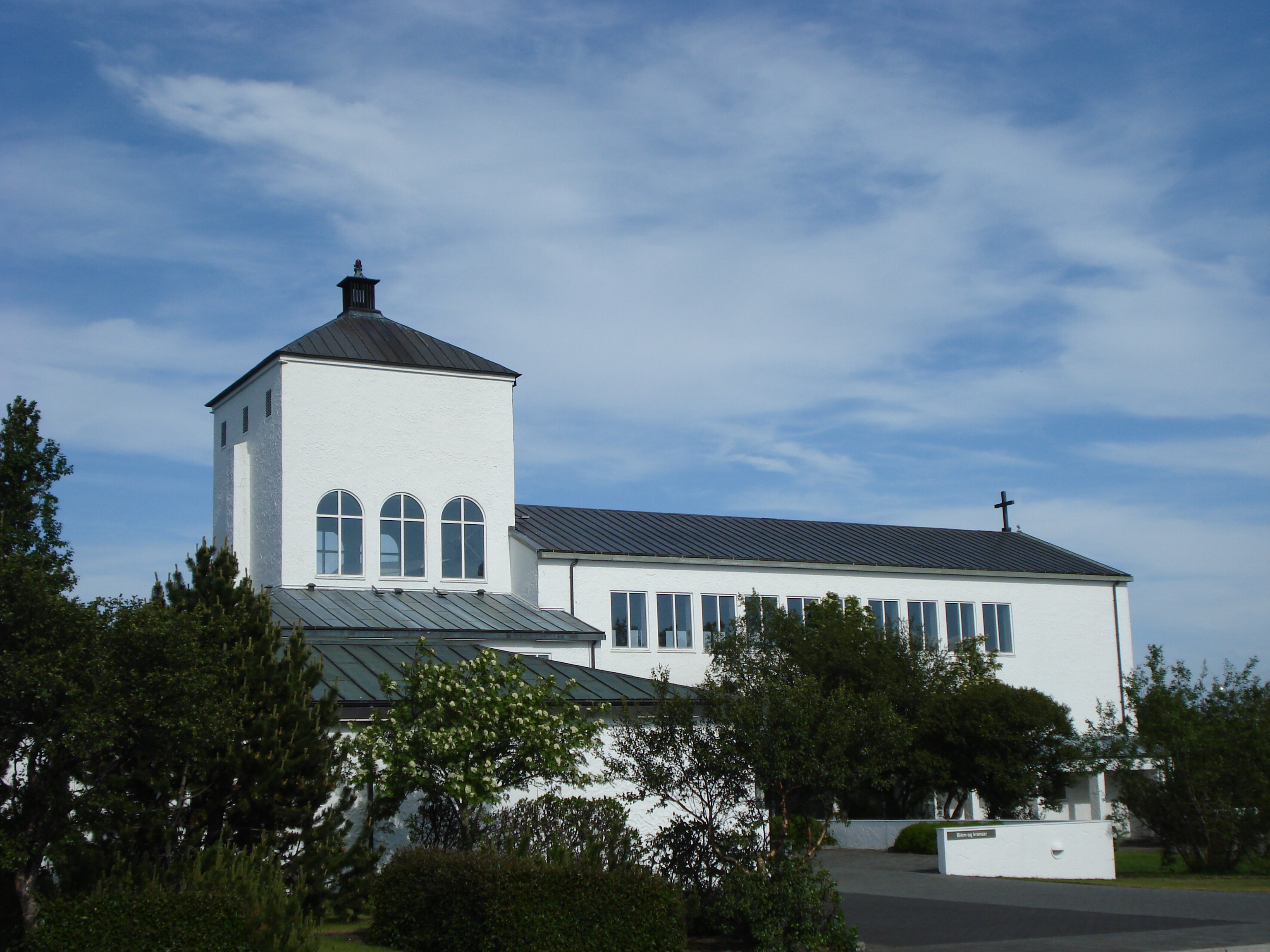
Fossvogur funeral church in Reykjavik, Iceland.

Cremations have not been common in Icelandic burial history. However, cremations have been gaining popularity and in 2018 41.66% of deaths in Iceland were cremations. There is 1 crematory based in the capital city Reykjavík. If an individual wishes to be cremated they must receive a special permit and register the request with Bálstofan. The cremation process is similar to a regular funeral except after the ceremony mourners do not go to the cemetery. The coffin is taken to the Bálstofan crematorium in Fossvogur. The coffin is then placed into a kiln and catches fire, the coffin and body turn to ashes in about two hours. The ashes are placed into an urn and closed. The urn can be buried at a special burial ground for urns at Fossvogur, Gufunes, or Kópavogur cemetery, with the relatives and pastor present. If the ash is not buried, the recipients must get authorisation for the ash to be scattered at sea or in uninhabited places. The ashes cannot be kept by the recipients and the urn is to be returned to the crematorium immediately after the scattering of the ashes. The place of ash distribution cannot be marked and ash cannot be distributed in more than 1 place.

== Religion ==
=== Pagan gravesites ===
Pagan grave sites with remains dating back to AD800-1100 have been found in 170 locations across Iceland. The largest pagan gravesite during this time had 10-13 graves, compared to other European Iron Age societies this is minuscule. The small size of these grave sites indicates that they were not shared by households during the 10th century and that each farm would have had their own household grave site. Pagan graves were often out of sight of the household or settlement they belonged to. Grave goods commonly found during this time were weapons such as swords, spears, knives as well as everyday items such as brooches, combs, beads, jewellery .

=== Modern pagan funerals ===
The Icelandic Ásatrú Society, Ásatrúarfélagið, or Ásatrú is an Icelandic religious organisation based upon pagan traditions of the earliest Norse settlers of Iceland. It is the fastest-growing religion in Iceland and the largest non-Christian religion.

Ásatrú funerals are usually held outdoors and the outdoor setting is chosen to reflect and represent the pagan deep respect for nature. The Gothi consecrates the occasion calling on a wide variety of gods to bless the occasion. The first part of the ceremony which takes place at the home of the deceased before moving to the burial ground is only attended by the closest family and friends. The deceased is dressed in their best clothes or uniform. The Gothi reads sections of the Edda or other appropriate literature and speaks a few words. A sign of the deceased favourite god is marked on the coffin. The sun-cross is used if there are no specific wishes. Grave goods are placed into the coffin such as books, utensils of their profession, food and drink, and even favourite pets can be buried in the coffin. The second part of the ceremony which takes place at the burial ground can include more readings from the Edda along with remembrances from family and friends. At the conclusion the Gothi wishes the deceased well and the funeral attendants throw earth on the coffin. At this point small symbolic sacrifices of sun crosses, Thor hammers or horses may be placed into the grave. Torches at each end of the grave are lit to form a sort of fire pit and these are kept aflame as the guests leave to join the feast.

In 2013 for the first time since the pre-Christian period, a funeral based on old pagan traditions was publicly performed in Iceland. This was the funeral of the photographer and journalist Ingólfur Júlíusson.

=== Christian gravesites ===
Changes in burial practices began with the conversion to Christianity in the late 10th early 11th century and this began the long-term trend of fewer and more communal cemeteries associated with churches. In contrast to historic Pagan burial locations, Christian burials were often located inside the home field boundary and associated with a nearby church or chapel.

=== Modern Christian funerals ===
Modern Christian funerals generally have a similar format that follows the Icelandic Church's Liturgy Book. However, they can be variable depending on the wishes and special requests of the relatives.

When relatives arrive at the ceremony they are greeted by the funeral director and the Pastor. It is common for the deceased immediate family to sit on the left-hand side of the church and the corpse is placed on the right-hand side of the church.

An example of a Christian funeral ceremony is as follows:

Prelude

Prayer

Music/Psalm

Scripture

Music/Psalm

Scripture of Gospel

Music/Hymn

Memories of

Music/Hymn

Prayer

Father

Music/Hymn

Commendation

Music/Hymn

Blessing

After the ceremony the coffin is carried out of the church to a hearse. Customarily the coffin is carried by 6-8 close relatives. Relatives follow the hearse to the cemetery. The coffin is lowered into the grave and the priest usually says a few words and prays. Once the grave is covered and completed, flowers and wreaths can be placed on top. A wooden cross can be placed on the grave if requested.

== Icelandic folklore and myths ==
There is an old Icelandic belief that whoever was first buried at a graveyard would not rot but would become the graveyard guardian and watch over all the people buried there.

The mythical undead creatures of the Sagas of Icelanders were called Afturganga. People believed the corpse had to be treated in a particular way to prevent the corpse from waking and wreaking havoc on living beings as an Afturganga. One way to prevent this was by putting nails in the sole of the corpses foot. Another way was to cut a hole in the wall closest to where the corpse lay and remove the corpse from the house through the hole. The front door was not used as it was believed the corpses ghost would remember how to enter the house and come back to haunt it.

== Icelandic cemeteries ==
=== Fossvogur ===
Fossvogur cemetery was consecrated in 1932 and a funeral church at the cemetery was constructed and open to the public in 1948. This church only serves as a church for funerals. The funeral church was constructed to improve sanitation of funeral practises and decrease funeral costs. Added to the church was a chapel, house of prayer, mortuary and crematorium. Only reserved resting places are now left at the cemetery. The graveyard guardian is Gunna Hinriksson, a weaver, who was buried on 2 September 1932.

=== Gufunes ===
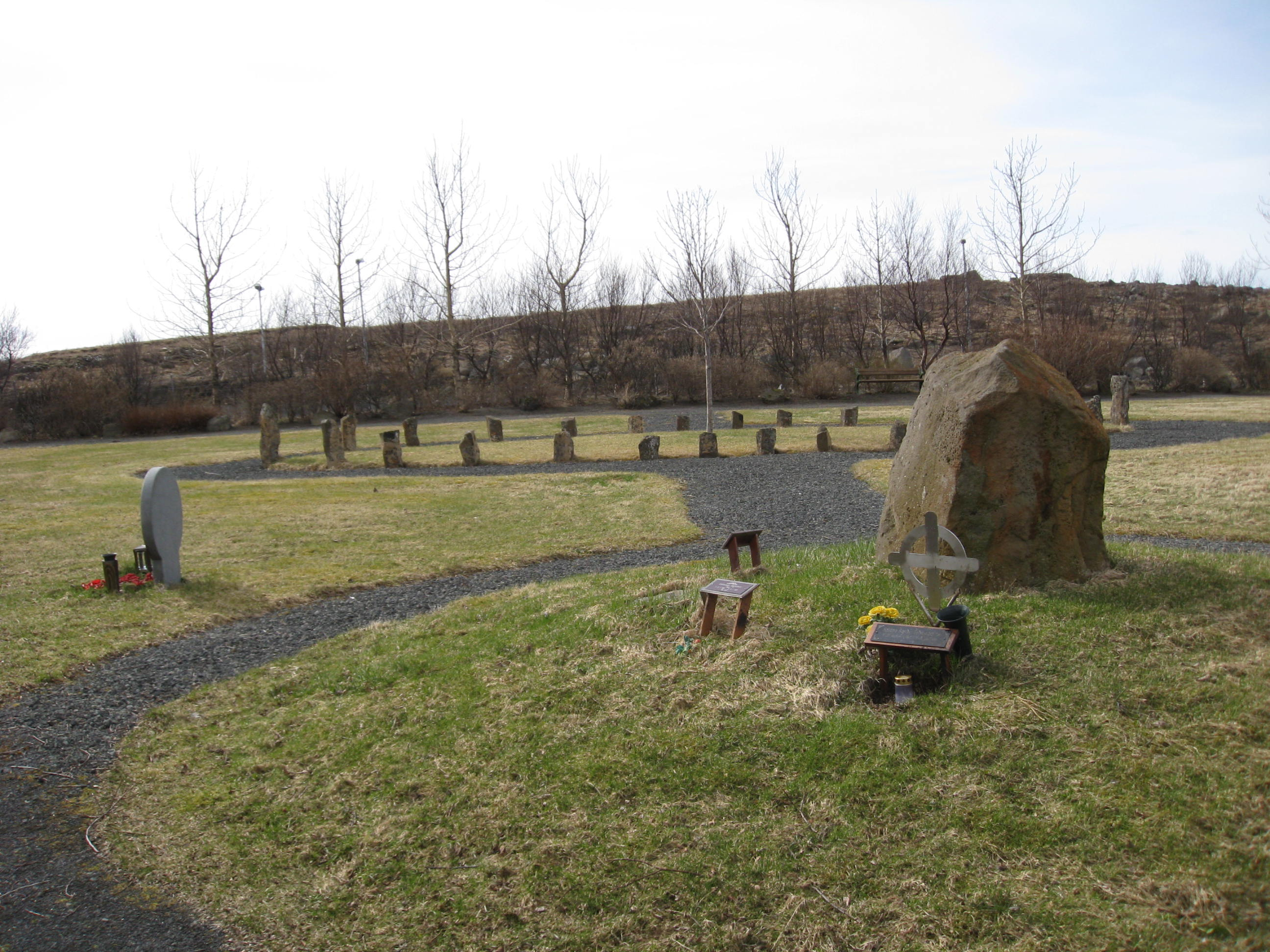
A pagan burial ground in Gufunes cemetery, Reykjavík, Iceland.

Consecrated in 1980. The graveyard guardian is Friðfinnur Olafsson, who was buried on 16 June 1980. This cemetery features a garden with plots for people of varying religions, Christian, Buddhist, Islamic, Ásatrú. Those who do not belong to a religious group but still wish to be buried in a cemetery also have a plot.

=== Kópavogur ===
Consecrated in 2006. The guardian of the graveyard is Guðmundur Helgason, a painter. The guardian was cremated and rests in an urn plot.

=== Viðey Island ===
One of Iceland's oldest churches and consecrated in 1774. Several people of national importance are buried here including Ólafur Stephensen, who was the representative of the Danish king and his son, a public official, Magnús Stephensen. Gunnar Gunnarsson, a writer and poet was also buried here.

=== Hólavallagarður ===
Gravestones at Hólavallagarður cemetery in Iceland.

Consecrated in 1838. The guardian of the graveyard is Guðrún Oddsdóttir, the wife of the magistrate Þórður Jónassen. As of 1932 all burial plots have been allocated and only reserved plots are remaining.

=== Sólland ===
Consecrated in 2009. A garden of urn plots where there is space for 17,000 urn graves. The guardian of the graveyard and first person buried here is the urn of Ásbjörn Björnsson, former director of KGRP cemeteries.

== Laws and regulations ==
Bodies must be buried or burned in an authorised cemetery or crematorium and must not be buried or cremated until there is confirmation of death by the district commissioner. A certificate is required for cremation from the district commissioner and chief of police. Any funeral services provided must have the permission of the district commissioner. A dead infant or stillborn body cannot be put into the coffin with another body unless the priest or head of congregation has been notified. The specific measurements for grave sizes in cemeteries are 2.50m x 1.20m and 0.75m x 0.75m for urns. Graves must be deep enough to allow a full meter from the surface of the coffin to the surface of the grave. All graves have a protection time frame of 75 years.
