= Sigfús Eymundsson =

Icelandic photographer (1837–1911)

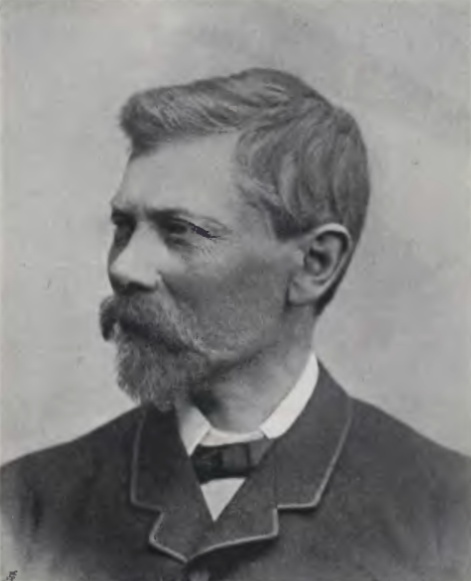
Sigfús Eymundsson

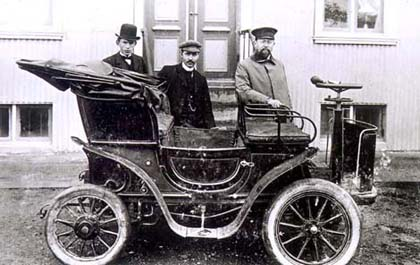
The first automobile in Iceland, photographed by Sigfús Eymundsson in 1904.

Sigfús Eymundsson (1837–1911) was an Icelandic photographer and bookseller. He practiced bookbinding from a young age and in 1857 he went to Copenhagen to study the profession. In 1861 he went to Norway where he studied photography. He then operated a studio in Copenhagen for a year and a half before moving back to Iceland in 1866. In 1867 he opened the first commercial studio in Reykjavík. He also founded the Eymundsson bookstore and published a number of books.
