= Lofsöngur =

National anthem of Iceland

English: 'Hymn'
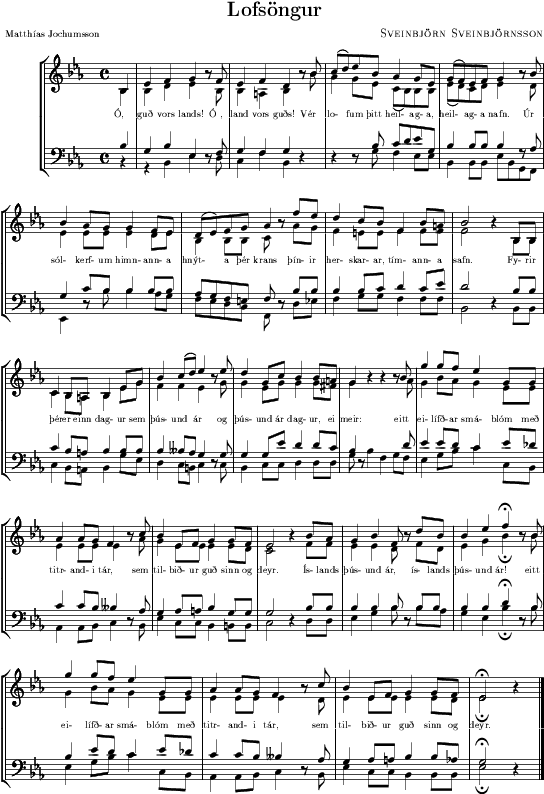
- National anthem of Iceland
- Also known as: "Ó Guð vors lands" (English: 'O God of Our Land')
- Lyrics: Matthías Jochumsson, 1874
- Music: Sveinbjörn Sveinbjörnsson, 1874
- Adopted: 1944; 82 years ago

Audio sample
- U.S. Navy Band instrumental rendition in D-flat major: file; help

"Lofsöngur", (Note: Icelandic pronunciation: [ˈlɔf̬ˌsœyŋkʏr̥]; lit. 'Hymn') also known by its incipit "Ó Guð vors lands", (Note: Icelandic pronunciation: [ouː ˈkv̥ʏð ˈvɔr̥s ˈlants]; lit. 'O God of Our Land' or 'Our Country's God') is the national anthem of Iceland. Sveinbjörn Sveinbjörnsson composed the music, while the lyrics were authored by Matthías Jochumsson. It was adopted as the national anthem in 1944, when the country declared independence by voting to end its "personal union" and become a republic.

== History ==
1920 orchestral and male vocal recording (first verse)
Vocal recording of the anthem

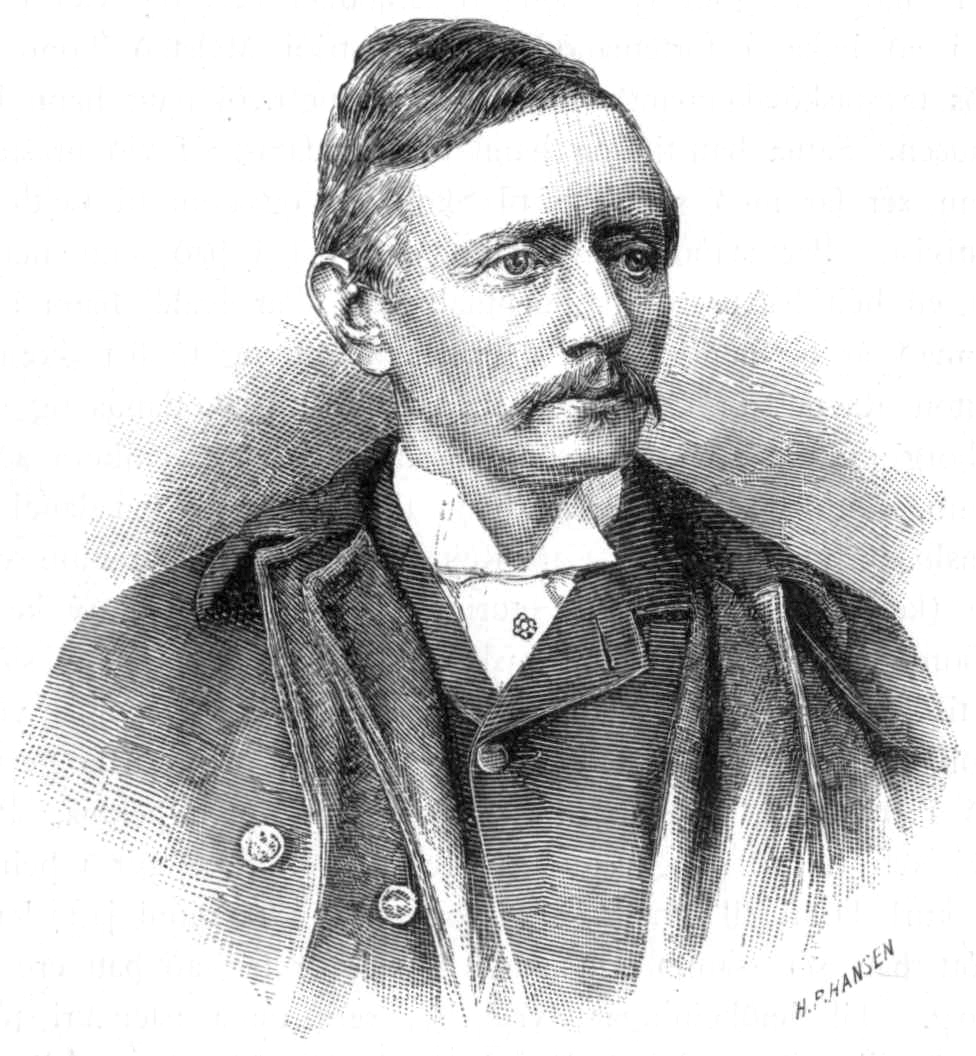
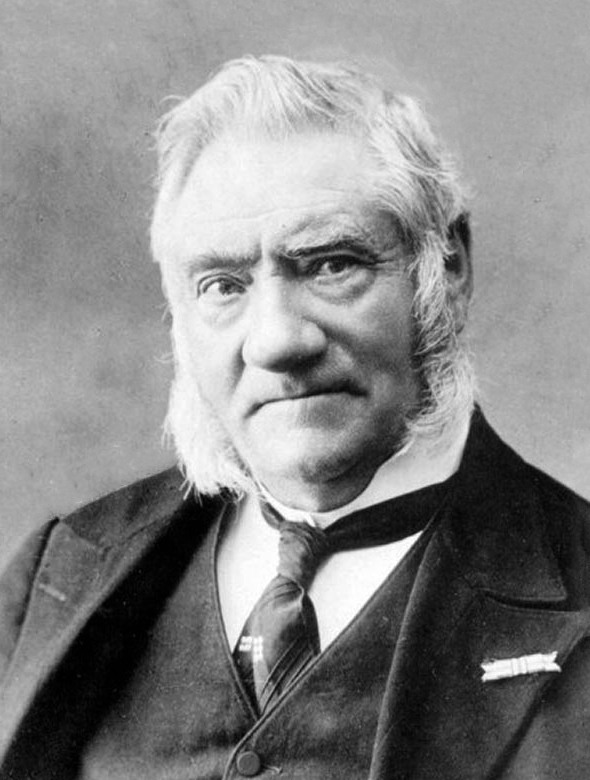
Sveinbjörn Sveinbjörnsson (left) composed the music to "Lofsöngur", while Matthías Jochumsson (right) wrote the lyrics.
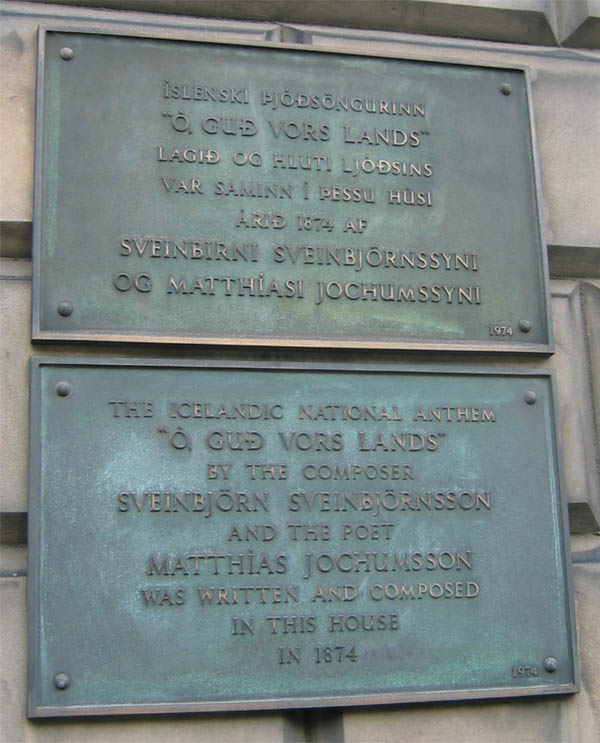
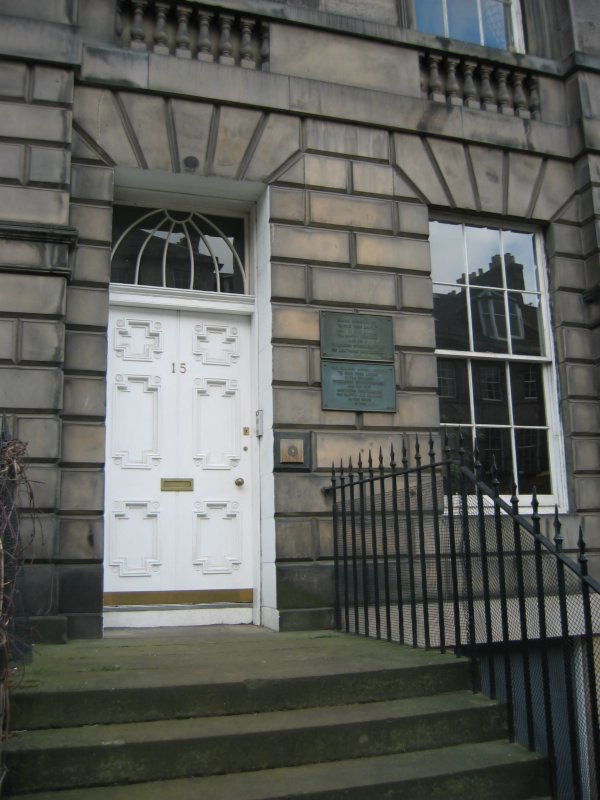
A memorial plaque at 15 London Street in Edinburgh recognizing the house in which the Icelandic national anthem, "Lofsöngur", was composed

The late 19th century saw music in Iceland develop and flourish. Though many of their initial composers had to study and apply their trade abroad due to insufficient opportunities on offer at home, they were able to bring what they had learned back to Iceland. One of these musicians was Sveinbjörn Sveinbjörnsson, who was the first person from his homeland to pursue "an international career as a composer". He sojourned in Edinburgh during the early 1870s, and wrote the music for Lofsöngur inside a town house located in the city's New Town in 1874. By 1922, the song became so well known and loved throughout Iceland that, in recognition of this, the Althing endowed Sveinbjörnsson with a state pension. He was the first composer in the country to be conferred such an honour.

The lyrical portion of it was penned by Matthías Jochumsson, one of the "best loved poets" in the country who was also a priest. Although the commemorative plaque in Edinburgh purports that both the music and lyrics were written there, it is nowadays believed that Jochumsson had in fact produced the latter back in his homeland. Much like Sveinbjörnsson, Jochumsson became the first Icelandic poet to be given a state pension. The Althing also bestowed on him the title of "National Poet".

It was written to coincide with the 1874 festivities in honor of one millennium since the Norse first arrived on the island. It is for this reason that the full translation of the anthem's title is "The Millennial Hymn of Iceland". The song was first played on 2 August that year at a service celebrated at Reykjavík Cathedral to commemorate the milestone, with the King of Denmark, Christian IX, in attendance. However, the song was not officially adopted as the country's national anthem until 70 years later in 1944, when Icelanders voted in a referendum to end their state's personal union with Denmark and become a republic.

== Lyrics ==
Although the Icelandic national anthem consists of three stanzas, only the first one is sung on a regular basis.

Icelandic original

Ó, guð vors lands! Ó, lands vors guð!
Vér lofum þitt heilaga, heilaga nafn!
Úr sólkerfum himnanna hnýta þér krans
þínir herskarar, tímanna safn.
Fyrir þér er einn dagur sem þúsund ár
og þúsund ár dagur, ei meir:
eitt eilífðar smáblóm með titrandi tár,
sem tilbiður guð sinn og deyr.
Íslands þúsund ár,
Íslands þúsund ár,
eitt eilífðar smáblóm með titrandi tár,
sem tilbiður guð sinn og deyr.

Ó guð, ó guð! Vér föllum fram
og fórnum þér brennandi, brennandi sál,
guð faðir, vor drottinn frá kyni til kyns,
og vér kvökum vort helgasta mál.
Vér kvökum og þökkum í þúsund ár,
því þú ert vort einasta skjól.
Vér kvökum og þökkum með titrandi tár,
því þú tilbjóst vort forlagahjól.
Íslands þúsund ár,
Íslands þúsund ár!
Voru morgunsins húmköldu, hrynjandi tár,
sem hitna við skínandi sól.

Ó, guð vors lands! Ó, lands vors guð!
Vér lifum sem blaktandi, blaktandi strá.
Vér deyjum, ef þú ert ei ljós það og líf,
sem að lyftir oss duftinu frá.
Ó, vert þú hvern morgun vort ljúfasta líf,
vor leiðtogi í daganna þraut
og á kvöldin vor himneska hvíld og vor hlíf
og vor hertogi á þjóðlífsins braut.
Íslands þúsund ár,
Íslands þúsund ár!
verði gróandi þjóðlíf með þverrandi tár,
sem þroskast á guðsríkis braut.

IPA transcription (Note: See Help:IPA/Icelandic and Icelandic phonology.)

[ou̯ː ǀ kvʏːð vɔr̥s lans ‖ ou̯ː ǀ lans vɔr̥s kvʏːð ‖]
[vjɛːr lɔː.vʏm θɪht hei̯ː.la.ɣa ǀ hei̯ː.la.ɣa napn̥ ‖]
[uːr sou̯ːl.cʰɛr.vʏm hɪm.nan.na n̥iː.tʰa θjɛːr kʰrans]
[θiː.nɪr hɛr.ska.rar ǀ tʰiː.man.na sapn̥ ‖]
[fiː.rɪr θjɛr ɛːr ei̯tn̥ taː.ɣʏr sɛm θuː.sʏnt au̯ːr̥]
[ɔɣ θuː.sʏnt au̯ːr taː.ɣʏr ǀ ei̯ː mei̯ːr̥ ‖]
[ei̯ht ei̯ː.liv.ðar smau̯.plou̯m mɛð tʰɪːt.ran.tɪ tʰau̯ːr̥ ǀ]
[sɛm tʰɪːl.pɪ.ðʏr kvʏːð sɪnː ɔɣ tei̯ːr̥ ‖]
[ist.lans θuː.sʏnt au̯ːr̥ ǀ]
[ist.lans θuː.sʏnt au̯ːr̥ ǀ]
[ei̯ht ei̯ː.liv.ðar smau̯.plou̯m mɛð tʰɪːt.ran.tɪ tʰau̯ːr̥ ǀ]
[sɛm tʰɪːl.pɪ.ðʏr kvʏːð sɪnː ɔɣ tei̯ːr̥ ‖]

[ou̯ː kvʏːð ǀ ou̯ː kvʏːð ‖ vjɛːr fœt.lʏm fram]
[ɔɣ fou̯rt.nʏm θjɛːr prɛn.nan.tɪ ǀ prɛn.nan.tɪ sau̯ːl̥ ǀ]
[kvʏːð faː.ðɪr ǀ vɔːr trɔʰ.tɪnː frau̯ cɪː.nɪ tʰɪl cɪns ǀ]
[ɔɣ vjɛːr kʰvœː.kʏm vɔr̥t hɛl.kas.ta mau̯ːl̥ ‖]
[vjɛːr kʰvœː.kʏm ɔɣ θœh.kʏm iː θuː.sʏnt au̯ːr̥ ǀ]
[θviː θuː ɛr̥t vɔr̥t ei̯ː.nas.ta scou̯ːl̥ ‖]
[vjɛːr̥ kʰvœː.kʏm ɔɣ θœh.kʏm mɛð tʰɪːt.ran.tɪ tʰau̯ːr̥ ǀ]
[θviː θuː tʰɪl.pjou̯st vɔr̥t fɔr.la.ɣa.çou̯ːl̥ ‖]
[ist.lans θuː.sʏnt au̯ːr̥ ǀ]
[ist.lans θuː.sʏnt au̯ːr̥ ‖]
[vɔː.rʏ mɔr.kʏn.sɪns huːm.kʰœl.tʏ r̥ɪn.jan.tɪ tʰau̯ːr̥ ǀ]
[sɛm hɪht.na vɪð sciː.nan.tɪ sou̯ːl̥ ‖]

[ou̯ː ǀ kvʏːð vɔr̥s lans ‖ ou̯ː ǀ lans vɔr̥s kvʏːð ‖]
[vjɛːr lɪː.vʏm sɛm plax.tan.tɪ ǀ plax.tan.tɪ strau̯ː ‖]
[vjɛːr tei̯ː.jʏm ǀ ɛv θuː ɛr̥t eiː ljou̯ːs θaːð ɔɣ liːf ǀ]
[sɛm að lɪf.tɪr ɔsː dʏf.tɪ.nʏ frau̯ː ‖]
[ou̯ː ǀ vɛr̥t θuː kʰvɛrtn̥ mɔr.kʏn vɔr̥t ljuː.vas.ta liːf ǀ]
[vɔːr lei̯ð.tɔ.jɪ‿iː taː.ɣan.na θrœy̯ːt]
[ɔɣ au̯ kʰvœl.tɪn vɔːr hɪm.nɛs.ka kʰvilt ɔɣ vɔːr l̥iːf]
[ɔɣ vɔːr hɛr̥.tɔ.jɪ‿au̯ θjou̯ð.lif.sɪns prœy̯ːt ‖]
[ist.lans θuː.sʏnt au̯ːr̥ ǀ]
[ist.lans θuː.sʏnt au̯ːr̥ ‖]
[vɛr.ðɪ krou̯ː.an.tɪ θjou̯ð.lif mɛð θvɛr.ran.tɪ tʰau̯ːr̥ ǀ]
[sɛm θrɔs.kast au̯ kvʏːð.ri.cɪs prœy̯ːt ‖]

Poetic translation

Our country's God! Our country's God!
We worship Thy name in its wonder sublime.
The suns of the heavens are set in Thy crown
By Thy legions, the ages of time!
With Thee is each day as a thousand years,
Each thousand of years, but a day,
Eternity's flow'r, with its homage of tears,
That reverently passes away.
Iceland's thousand years,
Iceland's thousand years!
Eternity's flow'r, with its homage of tears,
That reverently passes away.

Our God, our God, we bow to Thee,
Our spirits most fervent we place in thy care.
Lord, God of our fathers from age unto age,
We are breathing our holiest prayer.
We pray and we thank Thee a thousand years
For safely protected we stand;
We pray and we bring Thee our homage of tears
Our destiny rest in Thy hand.
Iceland’s thousand years,
Iceland's thousand years!
The hoarfrost of morning which tinted those years,
Thy sun rising high, shall command!

Our country’s God! Our country’s God!
Our life is a feeble and quivering reed;
We perish, deprived of Thy spirit and light
To redeem and uphold in our need.
Inspire us at morn with Thy courage and love,
And lead through the days of our strife!
At evening send peace from Thy heaven above,
And safeguard our nation through life.
Iceland’s thousand years,
Iceland's thousand years!
O, prosper our people, diminish our tears
And guide, in Thy wisdom, through life!

Literal translation

O God of our land! O land of our God!
We praise your holy, holy name!
From solar systems of the heavens, tied to thee is a wreath
By your armies, a collection of the times.
For to you, one day is like a thousand years
and a thousand years a day, not more:
eternity's lone small flower with trembling tears,
that worships its own god and dies.
Iceland's thousand years,
Iceland's thousand years,
eternity's lone small flower with trembling tears,
that worships its own god and dies.

O God, O God! We fall forward
and sacrifice to you burning, burning soul,
God father, our Lord from kin to kin,
and we pray our holiest speech.
We pray and thank for a thousand years,
since you are the only shelter.
We pray and thank with trembling tears,
since you offered our destiny.
Iceland's thousand years,
Iceland's thousand years!
They were morning hoarfrost, collapsing tears,
that warm with shining sun.

O God of our land! O land of our God!
We live as a fluttering, fluttering straw.
We die if you are not that light and life
that lifts us from the obscurity.
O be every morning our sweetest life,
our leader in the trial of the days
and in evenings our heavenly rest and our protection
and our commander on national life's path.
Iceland's thousand years,
Iceland's thousand years!
May they become a growing national life with decreasing tears
that develop on God's kingdom's path.

== Criticism ==
The anthem is notorious for being challenging to sing, due to its large vocal range of high and low vocal registers—spanning a minor fourteenth. "Lofsöngur" has been described as a Christian hymn to God with strong religious themes. Thus, its suitability as the national anthem in Iceland's increasingly secular society of the present-day has been challenged, notwithstanding the fact that the country still maintains an official religion in the form of the Church of Iceland. Some have suggested replacing it with a non-religious song that is more all-encompassing.
