= Þórður Sveinbjörnsson =

Icelandic politician (1786–1856)

Þórður Sveinbjörnsson (4 September 1786 – 20 February 1856) was an Icelandic politician. He was appointed to the Althing during the 1844 Icelandic parliamentary election.

Thórdur was the editor of Sunnanpósturinn in 1835.
