= 1844 Icelandic parliamentary election =

Parliamentary elections were held in Iceland in 1844. They were the first elections in the country's history.

== Electoral system ==
The Althing was composed of 26 members, twenty of which were elected and six of which were appointed by the monarch. The twenty members were elected in single-member constituencies by plurality voting. Each voter had two votes, with the runner-up becoming the MP's deputy. Voting was restricted to male property owners over the age of 25.

The constituencies were the counties of Iceland in addition to Reykjavík, the country's capital and only market town at the time.

== Results ==
=== Elected members ===
| Member | Constituency |
|---|---|
| Jón Johnsen | Árnessýsla |
| Eyjólfur Einarsson | Barðastrandarsýsla |
| Hannes Stephensen | Borgarfjarðarsýsla |
| Þorvaldur Sívertsen | Dalasýsla |
| Stefán Jónsson | Eyjafjarðarsýsla |
| Jón Guðmundsson | Gullbringu- og Kjósarsýsla |
| Þorgrímur Tómasson | Gullbringu- og Kjósarsýsla |
| Magnús R. Ólsen | Húnavatnssýsla |
| Jón Sigurðsson | Ísafjarðarsýsla |
| Helgi Helgason | Mýrasýsla |
| Þorsteinn Gunnarsson | Norður-Múlasýsla |
| Jakob Pétursson | Norður-Þingeyjarsýsla |
| Skúli Thorarensen | Rangárvallasýsla |
| Árni Helgason | Reykjavík |
| Jón Guðmundsson | Skaftafellssýsla |
| Jón Samsonarson | Skagafjarðarsýsla |
| Kristján Magnusen | Snæfellsnessýsla |
| Ásgeir Einarsson | Strandasýsla |
| Sveinn Sveinsson | Suður-Múlasýsla |
| Þorsteinn Pálsson | Suður-Þingeyjarsýsla |

=== Appointed members ===
Bjarni Thorsteinsson
Björn Blöndal
Halldór Jónsson
Helgi Thordersen
Páll Melsteð
Þórður Jónasson
Þórður Sveinbjörnsson
