= Matthias Hans Rosenørn =

Danish politician (1814–1902)

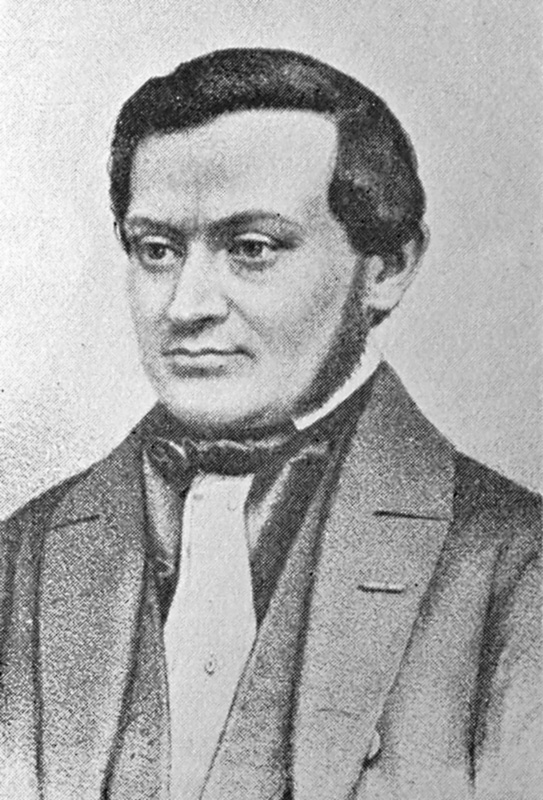
Matthias Hans Rosenørn

Matthias Hans Rosenørn (24 November 1814 – 30 March 1902) was a Danish civil servant and politician from Randers, Jutland, who served as Governor of Iceland (1847–1849).
