= Sveinbjörn Sveinbjörnsson =

Icelandic composer (1847–1927)

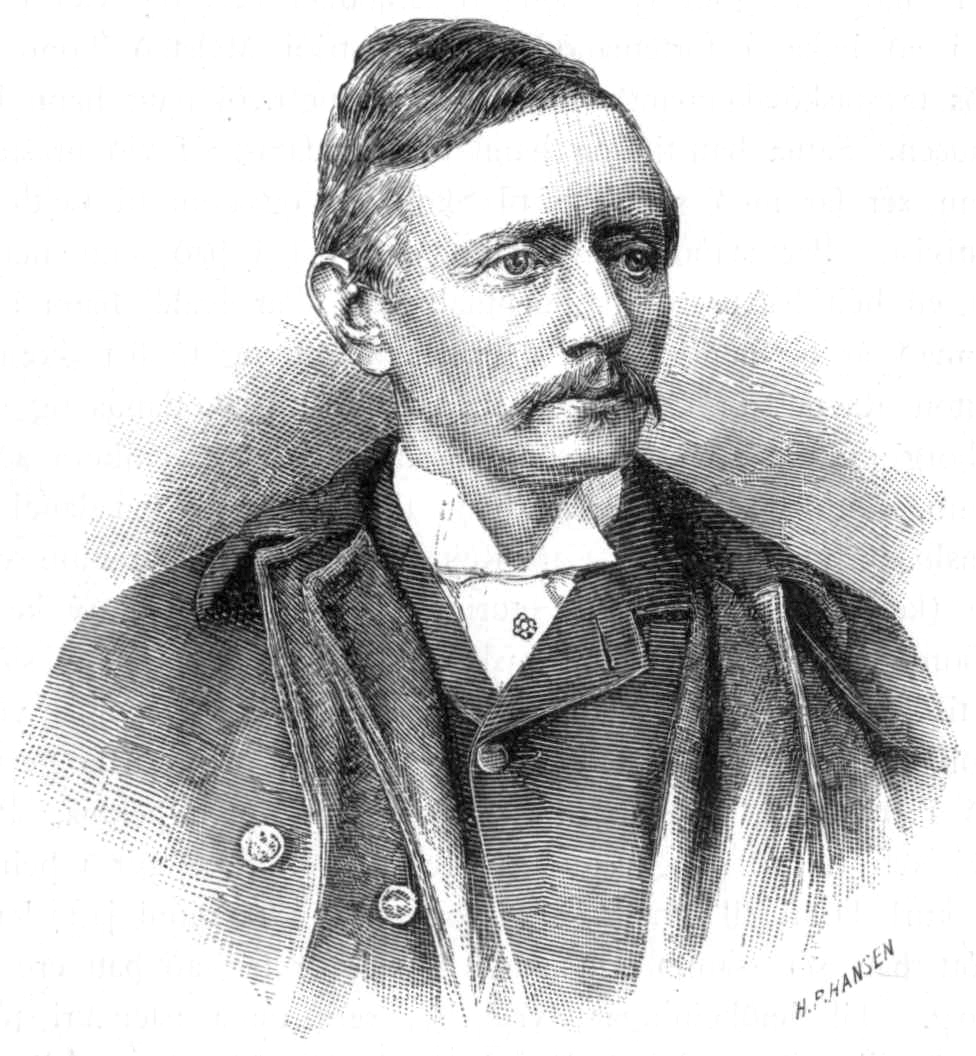
- Born: June 28, 1847; Seltjarnarnes, Iceland
- Died: February 23, 1927 (aged 79); Copenhagen, Denmark
- Notable work: Lofsöngur

Sveinbjörn Sveinbjörnsson (28 June 1847 – 23 February 1927) was an Icelandic composer known for composing "Lofsöngur", the national anthem of Iceland.

== Early life and education ==
Sveinbjörn was born in Seltjarnarnes. He was studying divinity when he met a young violinist and composer, Johan Svendsen. At the time, Svendsen had just finished his studies in Leipzig and encouraged Sveinbjörn to go and study music, either in Leipzig or Copenhagen. Sveinbjörn went to Copenhagen, but later carried on to Leipzig where his teacher was Carl Reinecke. Consequently, Sveinbjörn gained a far higher level of musical education than other musicians in Iceland at that time.

== Career ==
As the musical opportunities were limited in Iceland at the end of the 19th century, Sveinbjörn moved to Edinburgh. Later in life he spent several years in Winnipeg, Canada, where there was a large colony of immigrants from Iceland. He composed a substantial number of songs and piano works, as well as three larger pieces of chamber music: two piano trios (in A minor and E minor) and a Violin Sonata in F major, largely in the spirit of Mendelssohn and Grieg. In 1907 he wrote a cantata (Konungskantata) for the visit to Iceland of the Danish king Frederick VIII.

Sveinbjörn also arranged a considerable number of folk songs, with a volume of 20 arrangements published in Edinburgh in 1923 (Íslenzk þjóðlög, fyrir solo-rödd). His piano works, Vikivaki and Idyl, are also based on folk melodies and have long been among his most performed works.

His most frequently performed work is Ó Guð vors lands (Lofsöngur), composed in 1874 for the upcoming national festival (þjóðhátíð) to commemorate the millennium of settlement in Iceland; an event at which Iceland was given its first constitution by the Danish King Christian IX. The work, written to a poem by Matthías Jochumsson, was Sveinbjörn's first attempt at writing a song to an Icelandic text. It gradually became known as Iceland's national anthem, although its status as such only became legalized in 1983. A plaque commemorating their achievement is attached to Sveinbjörn's former home, 15 London Street in Edinburgh, where he and Matthías Jochumsson wrote the text and music.

== Later life and death ==
In 1922, the Icelandic parliament, Althing, decided to grant him a pension, which allowed Sveinbjörn to return to Iceland. In March 1923 he gave a concert of his own music in Nýja bíó, with a local male chorus and the violinist Þórarinn Guðmundsson, which was well received. In December 1923 he was made Grand Knight (stórriddari) of the Order of the Falcon for his contribution to music.

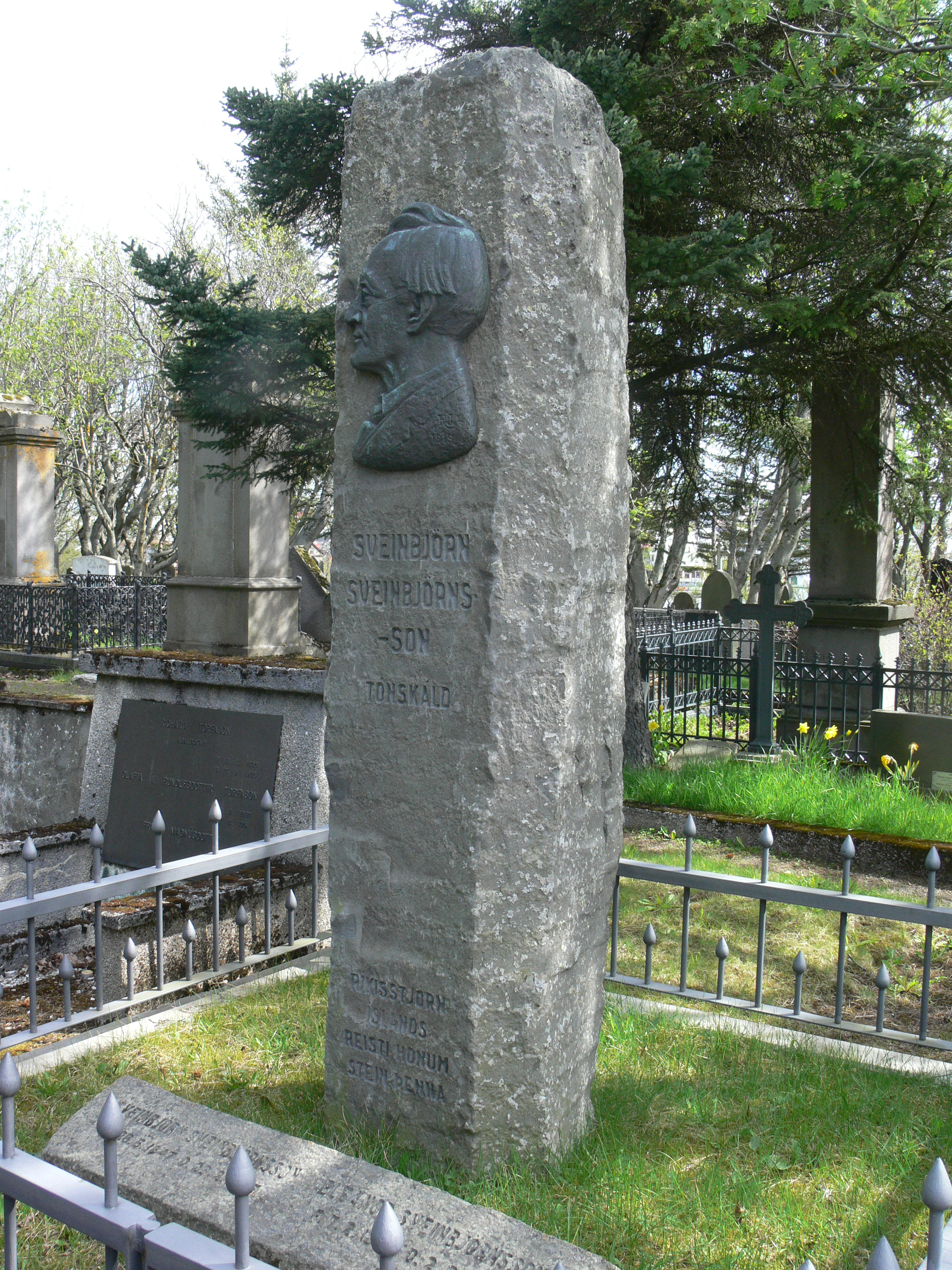
Sveinbjörn's grave

He only stayed in Reykjavík for two years, as the found the cold and dark winters unpleasant. He left for Copenhagen in autumn 1924 and died there in February 1927, a few months before his eightieth birthday.

== Recordings ==
- Sveinbjörn Sveinbjörnsson. Songs. Signý Sæmundsdóttir, soprano; Bergþór Pálsson, baritone; Jónas Ingimundarson, piano. Smekkleysa, 2000.
- Sveinbjörn Sveinbjörnsson. Piano Trios / Violin Sonata in F major. Nina-Margret Grimsdottir, piano; Audur Hafsteinsdottir, violin; Sigurgeir Agnarsson, cello; Sigurður Bjarki Gunnarsson, cello. CD. Naxos 8.570460. Naxos, 2007. [Includes Idyl in A flat major, Vikivaki in B minor, Piano Trio in A minor, Lyric Pieces Nos. 1–4, Piano Trio in E minor, Violin Sonata in F major, Barcarolle in F major.]
- Sveinbjörn Sveinbjörnsson. Chamber Music. Members of the Reykjavík Chamber Orchestra. Smekkleysa, 2011. [Includes Piano Trio in A minor, Piano Trio in E minor, Violin Sonata in F major, Reverie.]
- Sveinbjörn Sveinbjörnsson. Complete Solo Piano Music. Þórarinn Stefánsson, piano. Polarfonia Classics, 2024.
