= Torkil Abraham Hoppe =

Danish civil servant

Torkil Abraham Hoppe (10 April 1800 – 7 June 1871) was a Danish civil servant who served as Governor of Iceland (1841–1847).

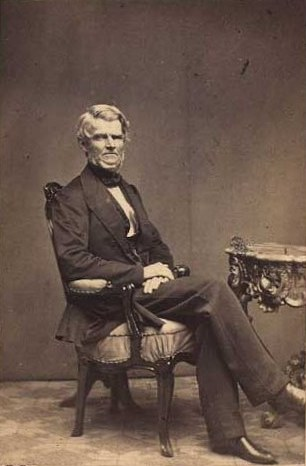
Torkil Abraham Hoppe

Hoppe was the son of Johann Christopher Hoppe, a naval officer and chamberlain, and his wife Johanne Magdalene Fjeldsted, daughter of Þorkell Fjeldsted, Governor of Norway. His brother was Peter Fjeldsted Hoppe, governor of Iceland from 1824 to 1829.
