= Jørgen Ditlev Trampe =

Danish nobleman and civil servant (1807–1868)

Jørgen Ditlev Trampe (5 May 1807 – 5 March 1868) was a Danish nobleman and civil servant who served as Governor of Iceland (1850 to 1860). He was commonly known as Count Trampe.

Trampe's most unpopular act, and the one for which he is best known in Iceland, was to dissolve the National Assembly in 1851 when it became clear that a bill he had put forward on behalf of King Frederick VII for Iceland to be annexed to Denmark would be rejected. Trampe had expected that the leaders of the struggle for independence would be difficult for him, so that on 4 March 1851 he had written to the Danish Ministry of the Interior requesting that Danish troops be sent to Reykjavík to maintain law and order. A Danish warship was sent to Iceland and at the same time Trampe was instructed to postpone the national assembly or dissolve it if he felt it necessary, which he did. Trampe remained governor of Iceland until 1860, but his popularity waned considerably with the events that took place at the National Assembly.
