= Björn Blöndal =

Icelandic politician

Björn Auðunsson Blöndal

Member of the Althing
- In office 1845–1846
- Appointed by: Christian VIII of Denmark

Sýslumaður in Húnavatnasýsla
- In office 1820–1846

Personal details
- Born: 1 October 1787 Blöndudalshólar, Iceland
- Died: 23 June 1846 (aged 58) Hvammur, Vatnsdal, Iceland
- Resting place: Undirfellskirkjugarður
- Children: 15 including Lárus Blöndal
- Education: University of Copenhagen (Hafnarskóli)
- Profession: Lawyer

Björn Auðunsson Blöndal (1 October 1787 – 23 June 1846) was an Icelandic District Commissioner and politician. He was a member of Alþingi from 1845 to 1846.

He took the family name Blöndal during his years of study in Copenhagen.

Björn played a significant role in the trial and execution of Agnes Magnúsdóttir and Friðrik Sigurðsson for the murder of Natan Ketilsson. They were the last people to be executed in Iceland, being beheaded at Þrístapar near Vatnsdalshólar in Húnavatnshreppur on 12 January 1830.

== In popular culture ==
Australian author Hannah Kent's novel Burial Rites was based on the story of Agnes and Friðrik and featured Björn as a character.
