= 1830 in Iceland =

- Decades: 1810s; 1820s; 1830s; 1840s; 1850s
- See also: Other events in 1830 · Timeline of Icelandic history

Events in the year 1830 in Iceland.

== Incumbents ==
- Monarch: Frederick VI
- Governor of Iceland: Lorentz Angel Krieger

== Events ==
- 12 January: The last executions take place in Iceland at Þrístapi, Vatnsdalur, with Agnes Magnúsdóttir and Friðrik Sigurðsson being beheaded for murder the murder of two men, including Nathan Ketilsson.

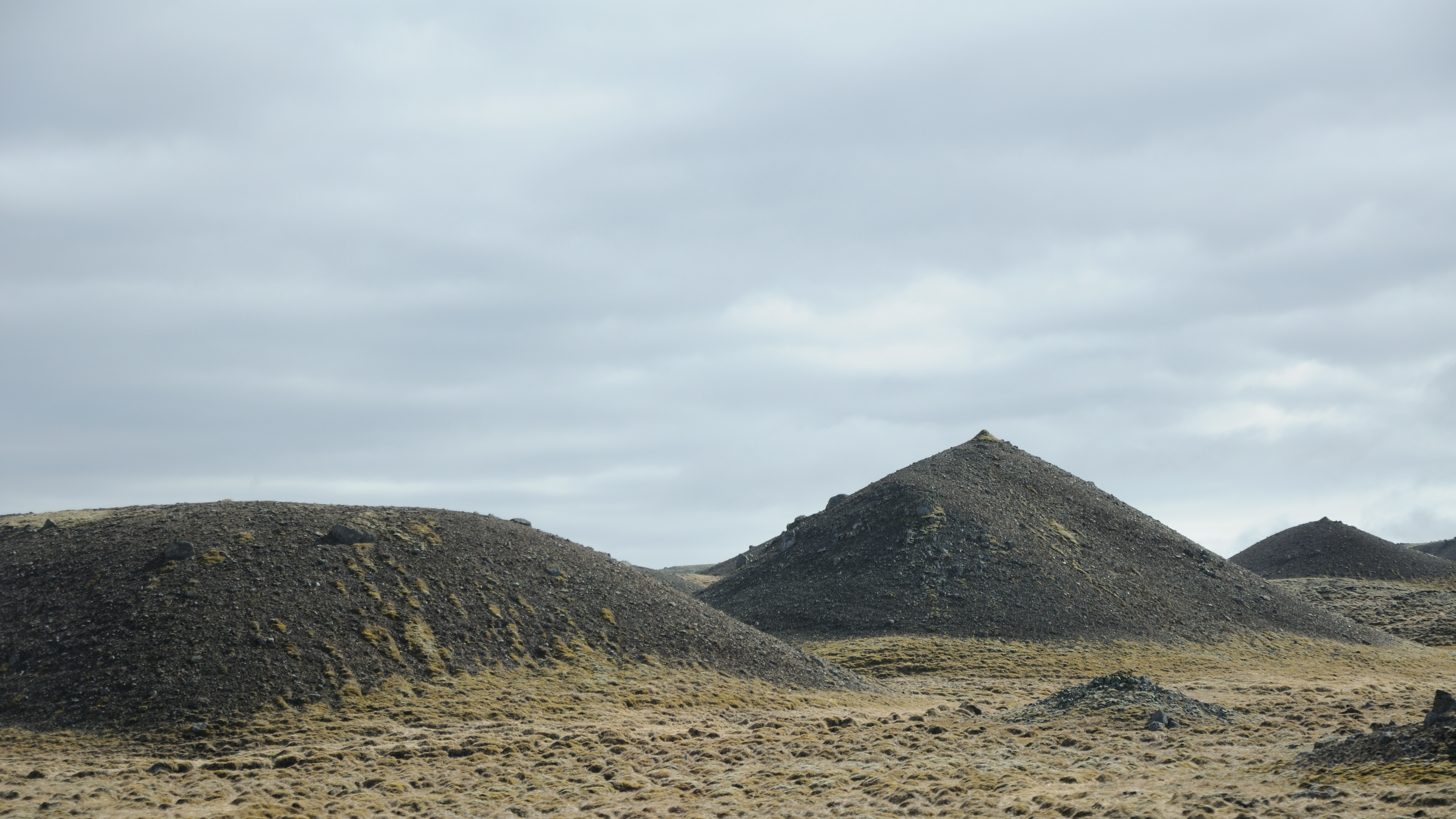
Hills near the execution site in Vatnsdalshólar

== Deaths ==
- 12 January:
  - Agnes Magnúsdóttir, murderer.
  - Friðrik Sigurðsson, murderer
