= 1828 in Iceland =

- Decades: 1800s; 1810s; 1820s; 1830s; 1840s
- See also: Other events in 1828 · Timeline of Icelandic history

Events in the year 1828 in Iceland.

== Incumbents ==
- Monarch: Frederick VI
- Governor of Iceland: Peter Fjeldsted Hoppe.

== Events ==
- 14 March 1828: Nathan Ketilsson is murdered by Agnes Magnúsdóttir and Friðrik Sigurðsson at Illugastaðir in Vatnsnes.
- In Stykkishólmur, Árni Thorlacius built a large house for his home and companies, the Norwegian house, which has been renovated and accommodates the local museum.

== Deaths ==
- 14 March: Nathan Ketilsson, physician.
