= Capital punishment in Iceland =

Europe holds the greatest concentration of abolitionist states (blue). Map current as of 2024 Abolished for all offences Abolished in practice Retains capital punishment

Capital punishment in Iceland was practiced until 1830, with 240 individuals executed between 1551 and 1830. The methods of execution included beheading, hanging, burning, and drowning. Danish laws were influential, particularly after Lutheranism's adoption in the 17th century. The last execution occurred in 1830, and the death penalty was abolished in 1928. Infanticide was a common crime, often committed by women, and many were sentenced to death, but their sentences were commuted. The death penalty was officially abolished in Iceland in 1928, and its reintroduction has been rendered unconstitutional since a 1995 constitutional revision.

== History ==
The medieval Icelandic Commonwealth (930–1262), characterized by its lack of central executive powers, abstained from employing capital punishment. However, the Althing had the authority to designate a person as "réttdræpur" ("rightfully killable"), thereby legalizing the killing of the individual in question. This act vested the execution power in anyone who chose to pursue it, rather than assigning it as a duty to state officials.

Capital punishment did not become a practice in Iceland until the middle of the 16th century, when Danish King Christian III imposed Lutheranism on Icelanders in 1551. The first documented execution based on official laws did not occur until 1582. Icelanders were compelled to adopt the Danish legal code, which prescribed the death penalty for offenses such as murder, infanticide, theft, sorcery, and bearing children out of wedlock. Between 1551 and 1830, an estimated 240 individuals were executed in Iceland. Execution methods encompassed beheading, hanging, burning at the stake, and drowning. While men were predominantly subjected to beheading or hanging, women were typically lowered into the river adjacent to the Law Rock itself using ropes, either leading to freezing or drowning.

Archaeologist Steinunn Kristjánsdóttir attests that drowning was the fate for women convicted of infanticide, while incestuous couples were beheaded, murderers were beheaded, thieves were hanged, and those found guilty of witchcraft were burned at the stake. Executed individuals were denied the privilege of burial in church cemeteries. The majority of those subjected to execution were vagrants, impoverished laborers, or women accused of violating moral codes.

Subsequently, when Iceland came under the jurisdiction of the Danish Crown, Danish laws were largely enforced. The prevalence of capital punishment notably surged with the spread of Lutheranism in the 17th century but gradually waned by the mid-19th century.

== Last execution ==
Iceland's most recent instance of capital punishment occurred on 12 January 1830, when farm servants Agnes Magnúsdóttir (33) and Friðrik Sigurdsson (19) were beheaded in Vatnsdalshólar, Húnavatnssýsla. They had been accused of the murder of two farmers, Natan Ketilsson from Illugastaðir, and Pétur Jónsson from Geitaskarð, on 14 March 1828. Following an extended trial presided over by the Supreme Court in Copenhagen, the pair received a death sentence.

This historic case served as the inspiration for the 1995 Icelandic film Agnes directed by Egill Eðvarðsson, and the 2013 novel Burial Rites penned by Australian author Hannah Kent.

While the last capital punishment sentence was handed down in 1913, it was subsequently commuted to a prison term.

== Abolition ==
Four years later, the final execution of an Icelander took place in Denmark. Following 1830, numerous Icelanders were convicted of crimes punishable by death. The majority of these cases involved infanticides, in which women, unable to provide for their newborn illegitimate children, resorted to killing them. Nevertheless, all of them were granted clemency by the King of Denmark. In 1869, a new law came into effect in Iceland, aligning Icelandic and Danish legal principles. This legislation abolished the death penalty for lesser offenses. By 1928, the death penalty was completely eradicated and has not since found a place in Icelandic law.

Since the 1995 constitutional revision, the reintroduction of capital punishment has been deemed unconstitutional.

== Sources ==
- Hvenær var síðasta aftakan á Íslandi?
