= 1836 in Iceland =

- Decades: 1810s; 1820s; 1830s; 1840s; 1850s
- See also: Other events in 1836 · Timeline of Icelandic history

Events in the year 1836 in Iceland.

== Incumbents ==
- Monarch: Frederick VI
- Governor of Iceland: Lorentz Angel Krieger

== Events ==
- Akureyri loses its municipal status in, regaining it only in 1862.
- Sunnanpósturinn begins publication.

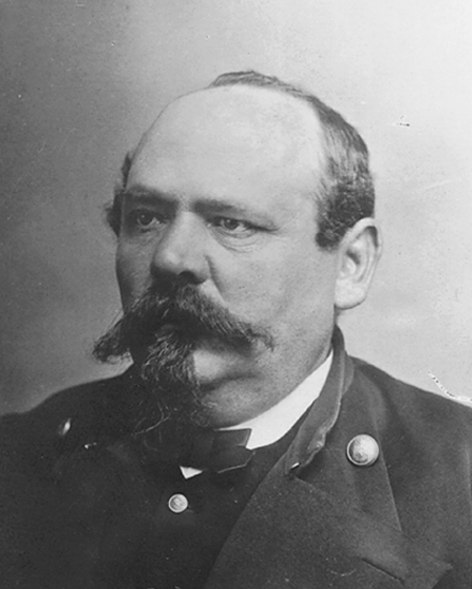
Lárus Blöndal

== Births ==
- 16 November: Lárus Blöndal, sýslumaður and alþingismaður.

== Deaths ==
- 23 July: Ísleifur Einarsson, politician.
