= Blöndal =

Blöndal is an Icelandic surname. Notable people with the surname include:

- Auðunn Blöndal (born 1980), Icelandic television personality, actor, and comedian
- Björn Blöndal (1787–1846), Icelandic District Commissioner (sýslumaður) and politician
- Halldór Blöndal (born 1938), Icelandic politician of the Icelandic Independence Party
- Lárus Blöndal (1836–1894), Icelandic sýslumaður and alþingismaður
- Pétur Blöndal (1944–2015), Icelandic parliamentarian of the Icelandic Independence Party
- Sigfús Blöndal (1874–1950), Icelandic language author and librarian
- Sölvi Blöndal (born 1975), member of Icelandic rap rock band Quarashi
