= 1829 in Iceland =

- Decades: 1800s; 1810s; 1820s; 1830s; 1840s
- See also: Other events in 1829 · Timeline of Icelandic history

Events that occurred in Iceland in 1829 in Iceland.

== Incumbents ==
- Monarch: Frederick VI
- Governor of Iceland: Lorentz Angel Krieger

== Events ==
- Lorentz Angel Krieger became the founding Governor of Iceland, taking over from Peter Fjeldsted Hoppe.

== Deaths ==
- 4 March: Grímur Jónsson Thorkelín, Icelandic–Danish-Norwegian scholar.
