= The Good People =

2016 Australian novel by Hannah Kent

- First edition
- Author: Hannah Kent
- Language: English
- Genre: Historical fiction
- Publisher: Pan Macmillan, Australia
- Publication date: 27 September 2016
- Publication place: Australia
- Media type: Paperback
- Pages: 386 pp
- ISBN: 9781743534908

The Good People is a 2016 historical novel by Australian author Hannah Kent. The novel takes inspiration from the case of the 1826 death of Michael Leahy in Kerry, Ireland.

== Background ==
While researching her first novel, Burial Rites, the story of the last woman executed in Iceland, Kent came across a story in a newspaper about a woman named Anne Roche who was tried for the death of a young boy called Michael Leahy by drowning him in the Flesk. A witness against Anne Roche was Mary Clifford, a servant for the boy's grandmother. The woman's defence was that she had been trying to banish the fairy out of the boy, implying that she believed him to be a changeling. Kent's attention was drawn to this story as Roche was acquitted by the jury, and after writing Burial Rites, she began to research the case more thoroughly, along with Irish folklore and Ireland itself.

== Story ==
Set in 1825, in County Kerry, Ireland, The Good People follows the story of Nóra Leahy, a woman stricken by grief after the death of her daughter and husband, and having to look after her disabled grandson Micheál. The boy cannot walk or talk, and screams all during the night. The local women begin to suspect that he is a changeling, a child taken by the fairies known commonly as the Good People – euhemerised versions of the deities of ancient Ireland, the Tuatha Dé Danann. Nóra hires a young girl, Mary Clifford, to help look after the child, but the rumours still circulate and they take the child to Nance Roche, a bean feasa, or cunning woman who is an expert in herbs, and who it is said is in communion with the fairies. Meanwhile Father Healy, the new priest in the area, is strongly against the old superstitions, claiming that as long as the Irish cling to the stories of fairies and monsters, they will never be free from British rule. The community is split by those who believe in the old superstitions, and those more skeptical, even though they too have had their own share of experiences which they cannot explain, or attribute to malevolent magic and curses. Eventually, Nance, Nóra and Mary perform a ritual on Micheál, dunking him in a place where two rivers meet in the Flesk, where on the third day of the ritual he drowns. They are arrested, the police called by the new priest, and tried. Mary is not charged and is a witness against the two elderly women who claim in court that the child was a fairy changeling and that they were only trying to get back Micheál. The two women are acquitted. When they return to the valley, Nance finds that her cabin has been burned to the ground by angry locals, and Nóra discovers that her lease on her house has been taken away from her and she must move in with her nephew's family. While Nóra is expecting Micheál to be waiting for her, he never shows up and she is left wondering whether the boy was truly her grandson, or whether Micheál and her daughter are still away under the fairy ráth dancing and feasting with the fairies.

== Notes ==
- Dedication: For my sister, Briony
- Epigraph: "When all is said and done, how do we not know but that our own unreason may be better than another's truth? for it has been warmed on our hearths and in our souls, and is ready for the wild bees of truth to hive in it, and make their sweet honey. Come into the world again, wild bees, wild bees!" – W.B. Yeats, The Celtic Twilight.

== Critical reception ==
Reviewing the novel for The Australian, Dianne Stubbings noted: "The Good People gave me chills. It reminds us how persistent the human spirit is in its yearning for answers, and the tragic consequences that may come when superstitious faith — even in good people — transmutes into blind action. It’s a haunting novel, shrewdly conceived and beautifully written."

In The Monthly, Helen Elliott concluded: "Kent, a natural writer with a talent for metaphor, has military command of her research. The Good People might be Wuthering Heights gothic without the psychological speed, a novel in black and grey, but for those who enjoy slow-burning melodrama and their history re-enacted in hi-res minutiae, this will please".

British speculative fiction writer Nina Allan described The Good People as "a novel of genuine power and considerable ambition". Writing in Strange Horizons, she said it is an "unsentimental portrayal" of rural Ireland and its harsh daily life. She called the way Kent associates the villagers' superstitious beliefs with the valley they inhabit "an act of almost miraculous imagining". Allan added that it is Kent's "power[ful] ... writing" that brings Nance, Nóra and Mary to life "in a way that feels true for the time, and yet that also has weight and resonance for a modern audience."

== See also ==
- The Hidden People
