= 1826 in Iceland =

- Decades: 1800s; 1810s; 1820s; 1830s; 1840s
- See also: Other events in 1826 · Timeline of Icelandic history

Events in the year 1826 in Iceland.

== Incumbents ==
- Monarch: Frederick VI
- Governor of Iceland: Peter Fjeldsted Hoppe.

== Events ==
- The Bishop of Iceland establishes residency at Laugarnes near Reykjavík.

== Births ==
- Benedikt Sveinbjarnarson Gröndal, poet.
