= 1831 in Iceland =

- Decades: 1810s; 1820s; 1830s; 1840s; 1850s
- See also: Other events in 1831 · Timeline of Icelandic history

Events in the year 1831 in Iceland.

== Incumbents ==
- Monarch: Frederick VI
- Governor of Iceland: Lorentz Angel Krieger

== Events ==
- Fjallvegafélagið (The Society for Mountain Trails) was founded under the leadership of Bjarni Thorarensen.

== Births ==
- 19 May: Steingrímur Thorsteinsson, poet and writer.

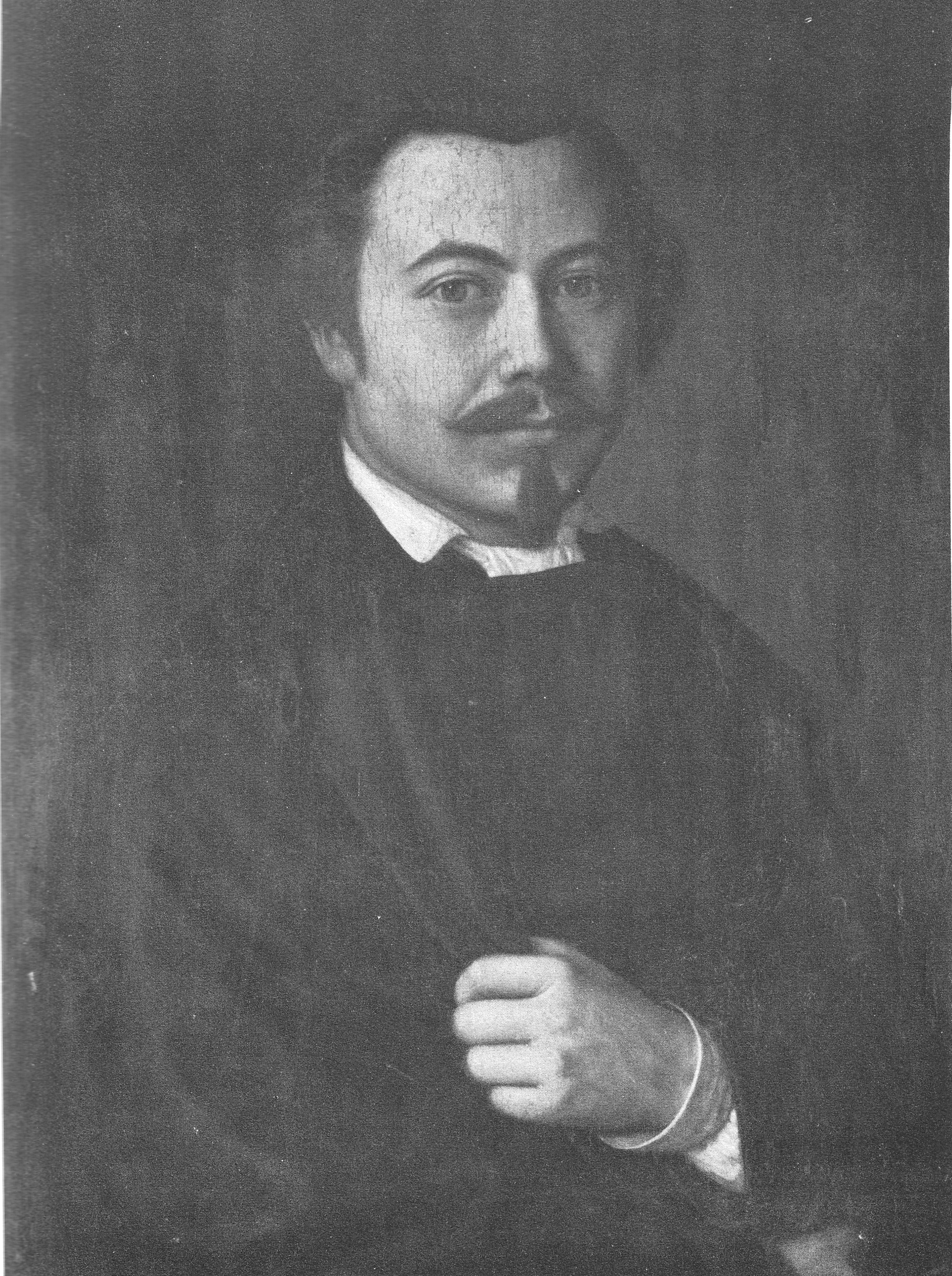
Steingrímur Thorsteinsson
