= 1824 in Iceland =

- Decades: 1800s; 1810s; 1820s; 1830s; 1840s
- See also: Other events in 1824 · Timeline of Icelandic history

Events in the year 1824 in Iceland.

== Incumbents ==
- Monarch: Frederick VI
- Governor of Iceland: Peter Fjeldsted Hoppe.

== Events ==
- Steingrímur Jónsson becomes the second Bishop of Iceland, following the death of Geir Vídalín the previous year.

== Births ==
- January 24: Hilmar Finsen, Danish-Icelandic politician
