= 1825 in Iceland =

- Decades: 1800s; 1810s; 1820s; 1830s; 1840s
- See also: Other events in 1825 · Timeline of Icelandic history

Events in the year 1825 in Iceland.

== Incumbents ==
- Monarch: Frederick VI
- Governor of Iceland: Peter Fjeldsted Hoppe.

== Events ==
- The National Library was moved to the loft of the newly renovated Reykjavík Cathedral.

== Births ==
- March 10: Gudmund Gudmundson, Early Icelandic Mormon.
