= 1832 in Iceland =

- Decades: 1810s; 1820s; 1830s; 1840s; 1850s
- See also: Other events in 1832 · Timeline of Icelandic history

Events in the year 1832 in Iceland.

== Incumbents ==
- Monarch: Frederick VI
- Governor of Iceland: Lorentz Angel Krieger

== Events ==
- Torkil Abraham Hoppe, Danish civil servant was sent to Iceland to make a report on the country's trading posts. Hoppe would later serve as Governor of Iceland (1841 – 1847).

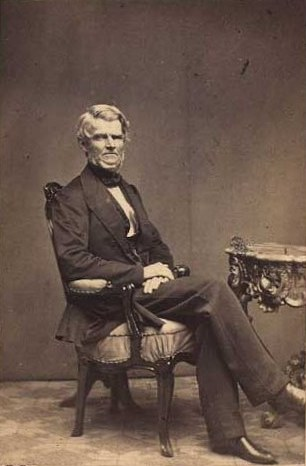
Torkil Abraham Hoppe
