= 1834 in Iceland =

- Decades: 1810s; 1820s; 1830s; 1840s; 1850s
- See also: Other events in 1834 · Timeline of Icelandic history

Events in the year 1834 in Iceland.

== Incumbents ==
- Monarch: Frederick VI
- Governor of Iceland: Lorentz Angel Krieger

== Events ==
- The turf-roofed church at Víðimýri in Varmahlíð is constructed.
- Andrarímur, written by Hannes Bjarnason and Gísli Konráðsson, is published.
