= Regions of Norway =

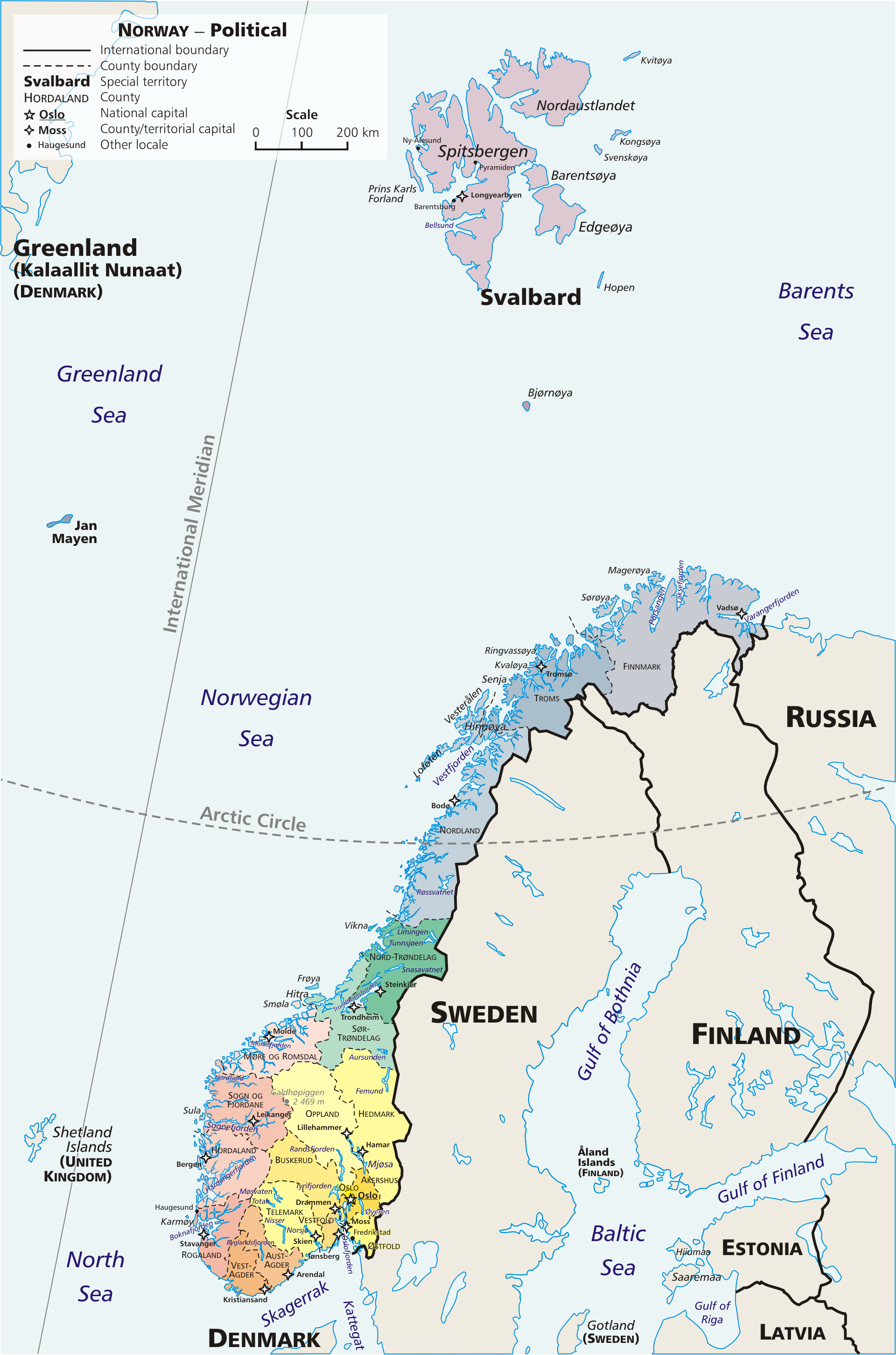
A geopolitical map of Norway, exhibiting its 19 first-order subnational divisions (fylker or "counties") with Svalbard and Jan Mayen. Each of the country's regions is uniquely coloured.

Norway is commonly divided into five major geographical regions (landsdeler). These regions are purely geographical and cultural, and have no administrative purpose. However, in 2017 the government decided to abolish the current counties of Norway (fylker) and to replace them with fewer, larger administrative regions (regioner). The first of these new areas came into existence on 1 January 2018, when Nord-Trøndelag and Sør-Trøndelag merged to form Trøndelag.

According to most definitions, the counties of Norway are divided into the following regions (these groupings are approximate):

- Northern Norway (Nord-Norge/Nord-Noreg)
  - Troms
  - Finnmark
  - Nordland
- Trøndelag (alt. Midt-Norge/Midt-Noreg)
  - Trøndelag
- Western Norway (Vestlandet)
  - Møre og Romsdal
  - Vestland
  - Rogaland
- Southern Norway (Sørlandet/Agder)
  - Agder
- Eastern Norway (Østlandet/Austlandet)
  - Vestfold
  - Telemark
  - Buskerud
  - Akershus
  - Østfold
  - Innlandet
  - Oslo

The division into regions is, by convention, based on geographical and also dialectical differences, but it also follows the county borders approximately. Other regions exist for various purposes of government. Administratively, the traditional regions as listed above play less of a role – the major administrative units are at county level.

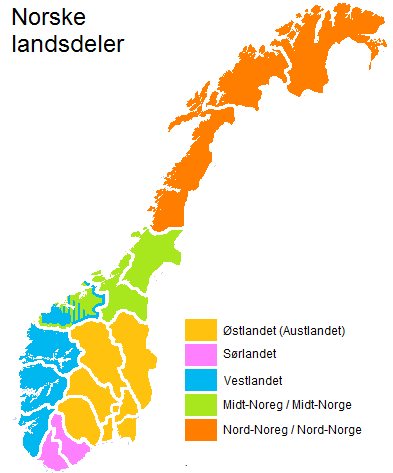
The five traditional regions of Norway. Sørlandet is more recent, while the other four are ancient. At least parts of Møre og Romsdal – particularly Nordmøre – identifies more with Trøndelag than with Vestlandet.

The region Midt-Norge/Midt-Noreg (Central Norway) is often used as a synonym to Trøndelag, but also includes Møre og Romsdal (according to some definitions only Nordmøre and parts of Romsdal). The southernmost part of Nordland (Helgeland) is also sometimes considered to be part of Central Norway. Similarly, Rogaland, or parts of Rogaland, is sometimes grouped with Southern Norway instead of Western Norway.

Svalbard is not a county and is not usually considered part of Northern Norway. The governor of Svalbard (sysselmannen) reports to the Department of Justice, whereas the county governors (fylkesmenn) report to the Department of Administration. Also Jan Mayen is an integrated geographical body of Norway. Since 1995 it has been administered by the county governor (fylkesmann) of Nordland.

Bouvet Island in the south Atlantic Ocean, Queen Maud Land and Peter I Island in Antarctica are Norwegian dependencies.

== See also ==
- Geography of Norway
