= 1827 in Iceland =

- Decades: 1800s; 1810s; 1820s; 1830s; 1840s
- See also: Other events in 1827 · Timeline of Icelandic history

Events in the year 1827 in Iceland.

== Incumbents ==
- Monarch: Frederick VI
- Governor of Iceland: Peter Fjeldsted Hoppe.

== Events ==
- Autumn: The Icelandic Literary Society's journal Skírnir begins being published.
- Klausturpósturinn, the first monthly magazine published in Icelandic is discontinued.

== Births ==
- Þorbjörg Sveinsdóttir, midwife and feminist.
- Páll Ólafsson, poet.

== Deaths ==
- 18 December: Hans Jonatan, escaped slave, soldier, farmer and trader.
