= 1835 in Iceland =

- Decades: 1810s; 1820s; 1830s; 1840s; 1850s
- See also: Other events in 1835 · Timeline of Icelandic history

Events in the year 1835 in Iceland.

== Incumbents ==
- Monarch: Frederick VI
- Governor of Iceland: Lorentz Angel Krieger

== Events ==
- The magazine Fjölnir began its circulation. The publication was made by the so-called Fjölnir men. They were Jónas Hallgrímsson, Konráð Gíslason, Tómas Sæmundsson and Brynjólfur Pétursson.

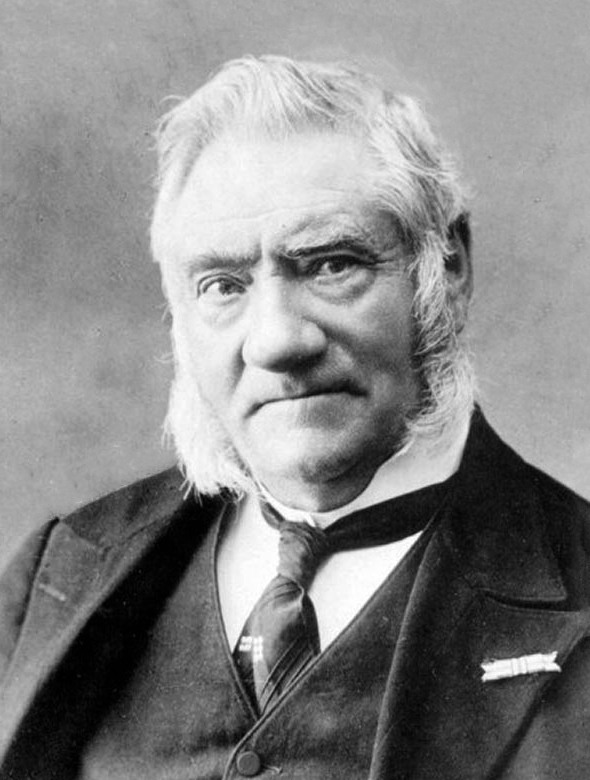
Matthías Jochumsson

== Births ==
- 11 November: Matthías Jochumsson, Lutheran clergyman, poet, playwright.
