= 1833 in Iceland =

- Decades: 1810s; 1820s; 1830s; 1840s; 1850s
- See also: Other events in 1833 · Timeline of Icelandic history

Events in the year 1833 in Iceland.

== Incumbents ==
- Monarch: Frederick VI
- Governor of Iceland: Lorentz Angel Krieger

== Events ==
- Jón Sigurðsson, leader of the 19th century Icelandic independence movement relocates to Denmark to study grammar and history at the University of Copenhagen.

== Births ==
- 1 February: Eiríkur Magnússon, scholar.

== Deaths ==
- Bjarni Sívertsen, merchant
