= Vatnsdalur =

Valley in Northwestern Region, Iceland

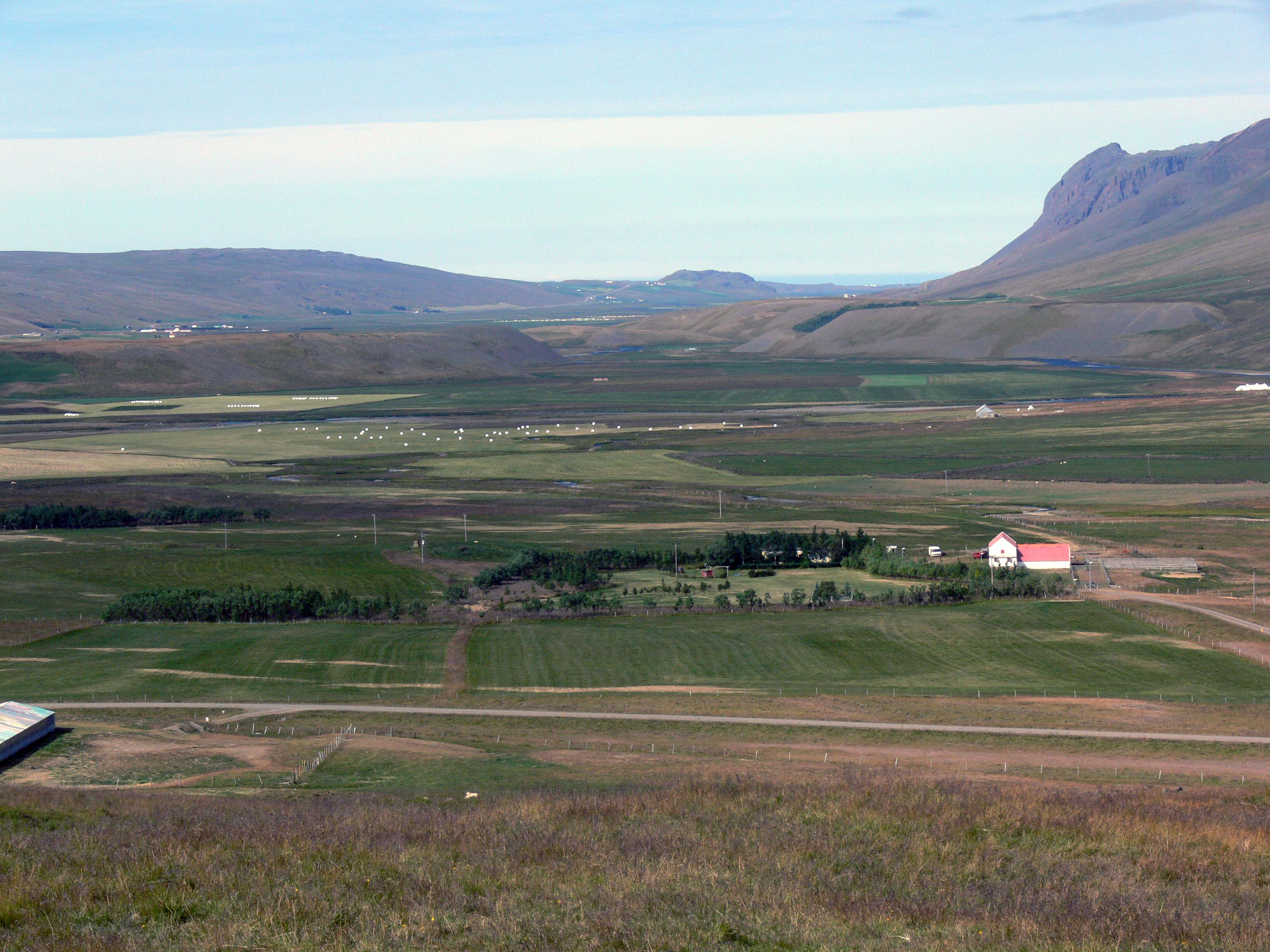

- Location within Iceland
- Length: 25 km (16 mi) North-South
- Width: 1.9 km (1.2 mi)

Naming
- English translation: 'Lake Valley' or 'Valley of Lakes'

Geology
- Type: Glacial trough

Geography
- Country: Iceland
- Coordinates: 65°25′N 20°17′W
- Traversed by: Vatnsdalsvegur (Road 722)
- River: Vatnsdalsá
- Interactive map of Vatnsdalur

Vatnsdalur is a glacial trough valley in the Húnabyggð municipality of Northwestern Region, Iceland. The Vatnsdæla saga, one of the sagas of Icelanders, chronicles the lives of the valley's original Norse settlers and their descendants.

== Geography ==
Vatnsdalur is about 25 km (16 mi) long and lies between the mountains Víðidalsfjall, to the west, and Vatnsdalsfjall, to the east. The valley floor spans slightly less than 2 km (1.2 mi) at its widest.

The valley is situated south of the town of Blönduós and southeast of the Hóp tidal lagoon. It is less than 10 km (6.2 mi) south-southeast of the Húnaflói.

It was part of the historical county of Austur-Húnavatnssýsla and, later, was located in Húnavatnshreppur ('Húnavatn municipality') until Húnavatnshreppur and Blönduós municipality merged to form Húnabyggð municipality in 2022.

=== Bodies of water ===
==== Vatnsdalsá ====
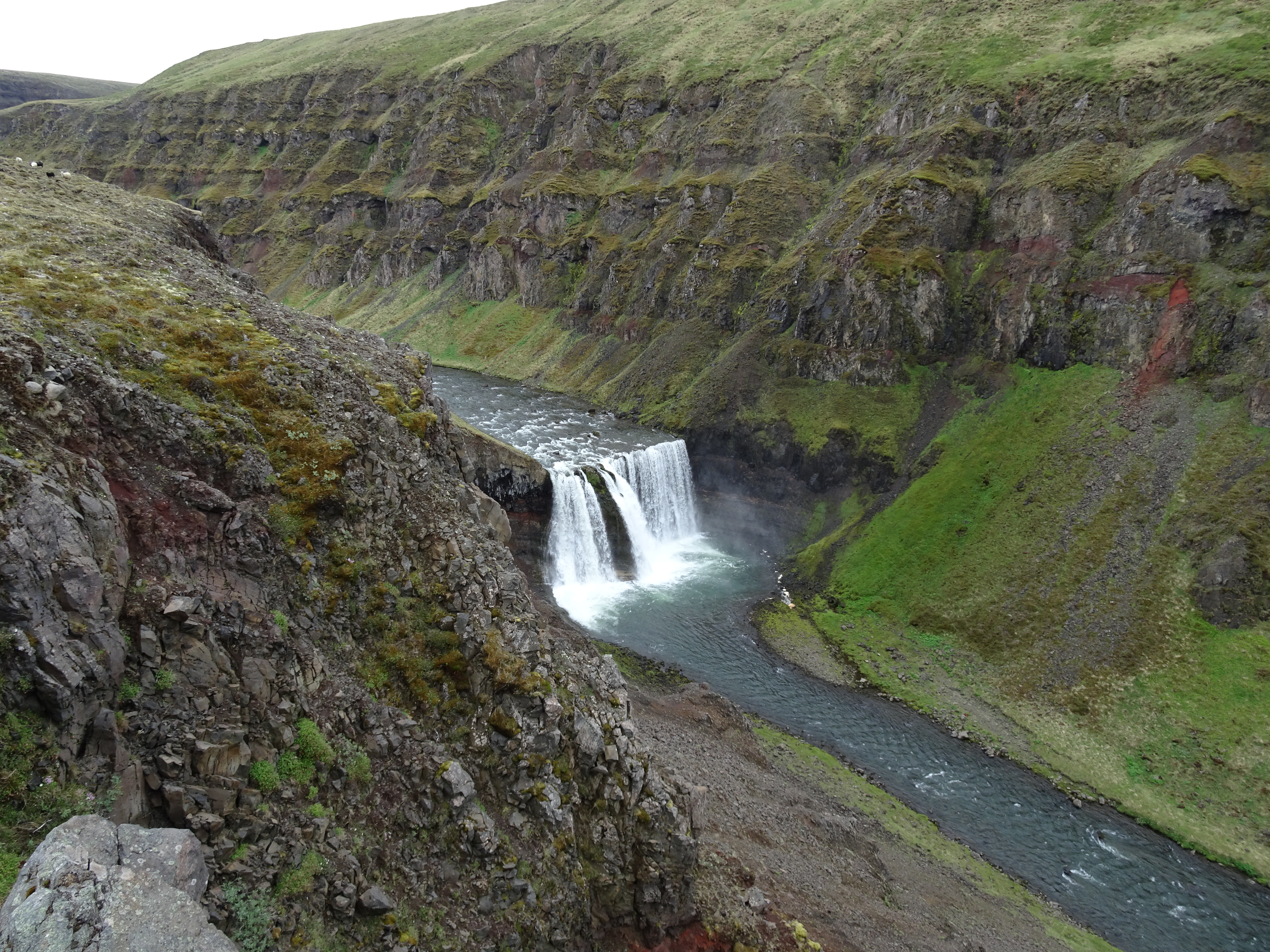
Dalsafoss on the Vatnsdalsá

The Vatnsdalsá, one of the famed salmon rivers of northern Iceland, runs through the Vatnsdalur. The north-flowing river is 74 km (46 mi) long and fed by a number of waterfalls, the highest of which is Skinandi. Other notable falls in the river valley are Kerarfoss, Rjukandi, Dalfoss, and Stekkjafoss.

==== Flóðið ====
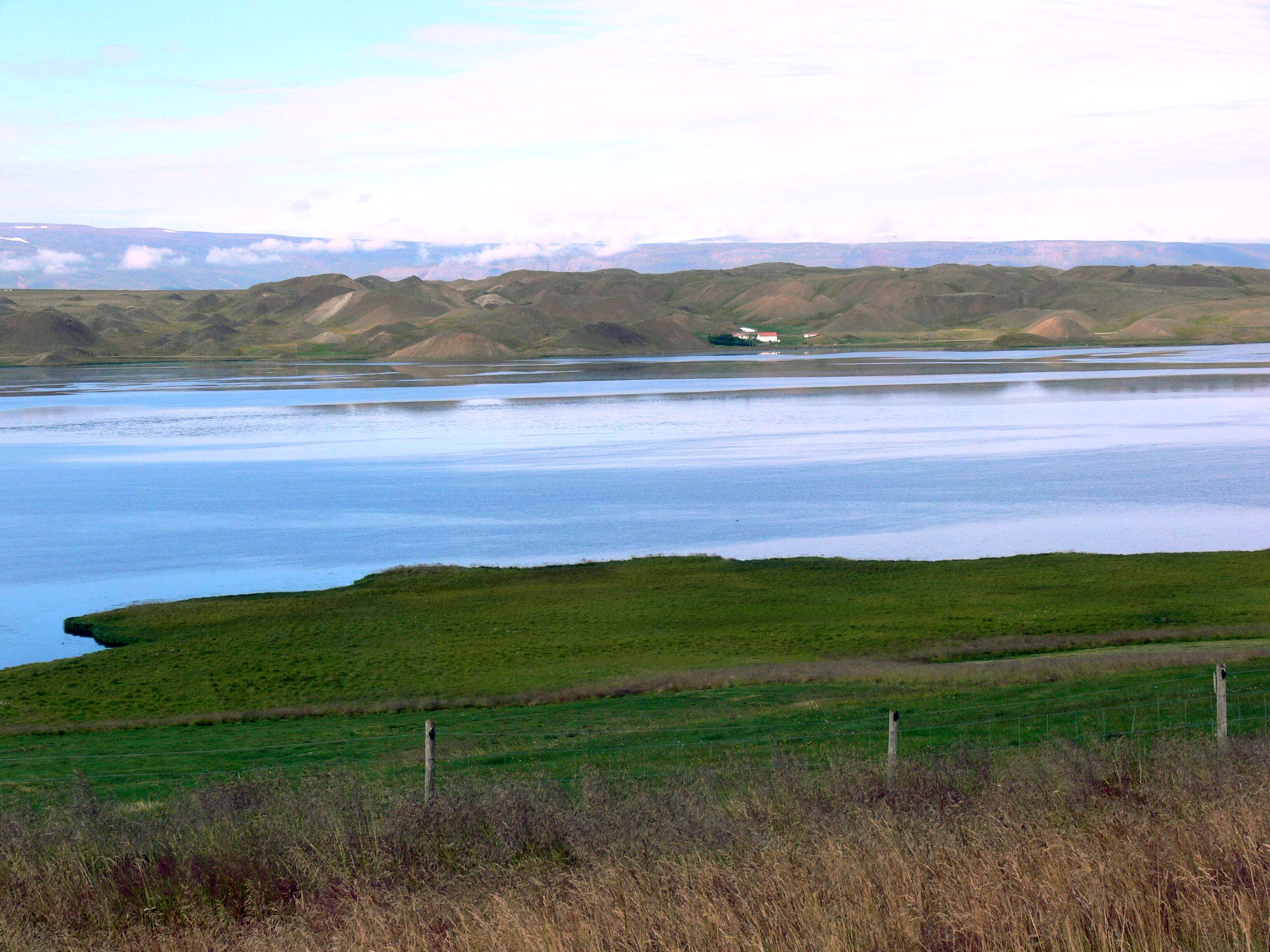
Flóðið

At the northeast mouth of the Vatnsdalur is a 2.6 km^{2} (1.0 mi^{2}) lake called Flóðið ('The Flood'). A landslide lake, it was formed on 8 October 1720 by the Bjarnastaðaskríða – the 'Bjarni rockslide', so named because it destroyed the Bjarnastaðir farm – when skree (skríða) and other debris falling from the Vatnsdalsfjall caused the Vatnsdalsá to be dammed and flood the grassy wetland that was previously found there. Records describe three ponds in the area immediately prior to the formation of Flóðið – called Hólatjörn, Körtjörn, and Breiðabólstaðartjörn – which were submerged in the flood and absorbed into the newly created lake.

Prior to the formation of the lake, the Vatnsdalsá emptied into the Húnaflói via the Húnavatn, a small lake southwest of Blönduós; since the damming, the 8 km (5.0 mi) portion of the stream running north from the Flóðið to the Húnavatn is called the Hnausakvísl.

==== Kattarauga ====
On the western side of the valley is the Kattarauga (lit. 'Cat's Eye'), an approximately 15 m (49 ft) deep pond fed by a natural spring. The name is derived from the spring source at the bottom of the pond, which can be seen through the clear waters of the pond and is said to glint like a cat’s eye in favorable conditions. It has two floating 'islets' of less than 1 m^{2} (11 ft^{2}) each, which drift in the wind. Kattarauga was designated as an International Union for Conservation of Nature (IUCN) Category III protected area in 1975, acknowledging it as a natural monument of unique value worthy of specific protections.

=== Vatnsdalshólar ===
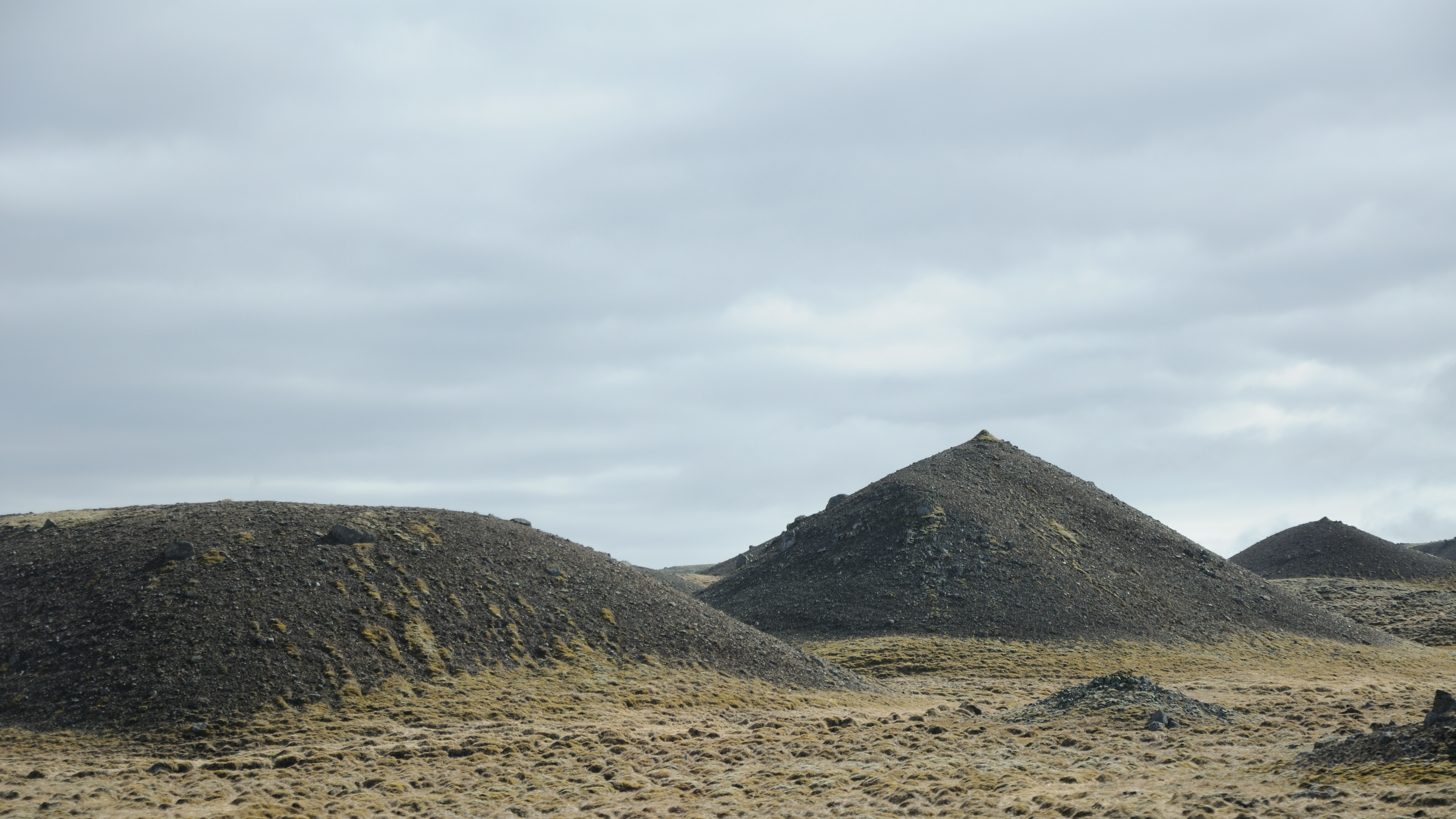
Some mounds of the Vatnsdalshólar

There are three landforms said to be "innumerable" or "uncountable" in Icelandic proverb: the lakes of the Tvídægra and/or Arnarvatnsheiði moors, (Note: Texts identify the "innumerable" lakes as belonging to either the Tvídægra or Arnarvatnsheiði moors. The Tvídægra heath lies to the immediate west of Arnarvatnsheiði highland and sources may use the locations interchangeably.) the islands of Breiðafjörður bay, and the Vatnsdalshólar hillocks.

The mounds of Vatnsdalshólar range from less than 1 m (3.3 ft) to about 18 m (60 ft), with most rising to 5 m (15 ft) or less. They were formed by many landslides from the Vatmsdalsfjall mountain. Several major landslides have occurred since the area was settled, including the Skíðastaðaskriða in 1545, in which fourteen people were killed, and the Bjarnastaðaskríða in 1720, which caused the formation of the Flóðið. The last major landslide took place in 1811 and destroyed a church.

However, most of the Vatnsdalshólar, which cover a total area of about 40 km^{2} (15 mi^{2}), were created by a landslide or multiple landslides around 10,000 years ago, well before the time of Landnahme.

== Vatnsdæla saga ==
The valley is the setting of the Vatnsdæla saga, one of the sagas of Icelanders. The saga chronicles the life of Ingimundr the Old Thorsteinsson or Ingimundr the Aged Thorsteinsson (Old Norse: Ingimundr inn gamli Þorsteinsson; Icelandic: Ingimundur gamli Þorsteinsson; sometimes Anglicized as Ingemund), a landnámsmaður ('pioneering settler of Iceland'), and several generations of his descendants.

Ingimundr the Old (c. 865 – c. 935) is the principal character of the saga, which describes his youth in Norway and time spent as a viking fighting alongside King Harald Fairhair, including in the Battle of Hafrsfjord. Ingimundr won King Harald's favor and friendship by fighting well and bravely at Hafrsfjord and was rewarded with a silver amulet of the fertility god Freyr and a noble marriage to Vigdís Þórisdóttir, half-sister of Harald's granddaughter, Bergljót Þórisdóttir, as a daughter of Þórir Rǫgnvaldsson, jarl of Møre.

At a Midwinter feast hosted by King Harald, a Sámi seeress called Heiður völva foretold that Ingimundr would settle in Iceland. Though he initially dismissed the idea of leaving Norway, where he was a liegeman to the king and set to inherit fine ancestral estates, circumstances eventually led him to emigrate to Iceland with the blessing of King Harald. He stopped at Vatnsdalur, attracted by the greenery of the valley.

Vigdís, his wife, was pregnant at the time and her labor began near a stand of trees at the mouth of the valley. It was there that she gave birth to a baby girl, Þórdís Ingimundardóttir, the first person born in the Húnavatn district and her role as the first native of Húnavatn is still remembered today. Ingimundr called the place where she was born Þórdísarholt ('Þórdís' copse'). Though the original trees are no longer present, a small grove was planted and named Þórdísarlundur in her honor; it stands at the southern edge of the Vatnsdalshólar along with a memorial stone commemorating the birthplace.

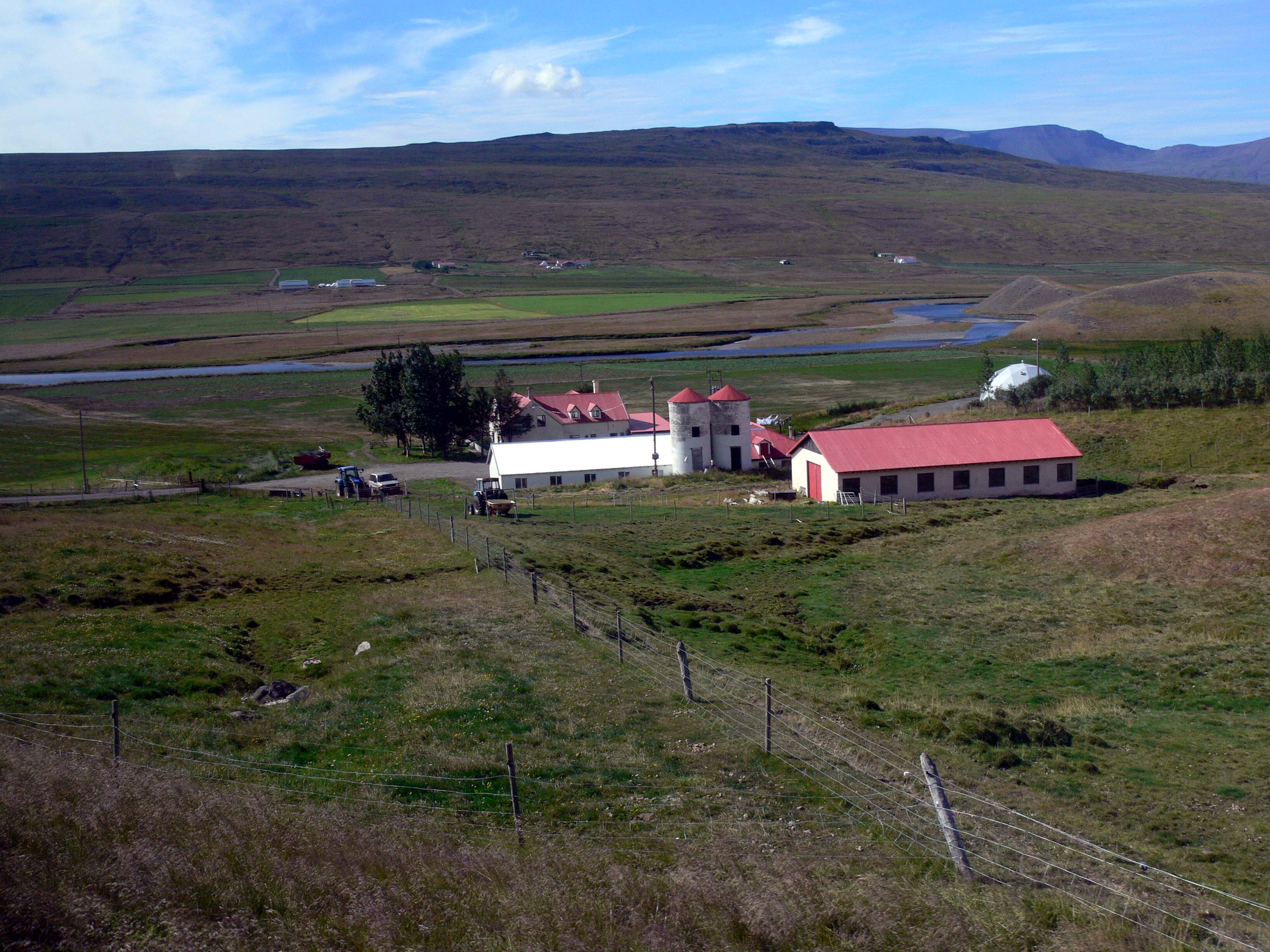
Hof í Vatnsdal, where Ingimundr the Old is said to have established the first homestead in Vatnsdalur

The family settled the manor Hof í Vatnsdal ('Temple in Vatnsdal'), where Ingimundr is said to have built a 30 m (98 ft) long temple on a steep hillock overlooking the farm, called Goðhóll. Archaeologists also revealed a cemetery at Hof from the early Christian period, which was in use from 1104 at the latest.

Ingimundr and Vigdis also had two sons, Jökull Ingimundarson and Þorsteinn Ingimundarson, who settled in Vatnsdalur.

The saga describes early Iceland as a place of magic and the supernatural, however, the stories of the Vatnsdæla saga are rooted in historical events and feature verifiable locations and characters based on real Icelanders. Archaeologists have identified the remains of Ingimundr's farm and the locations of several other homesteads named in the saga.

== Last execution in Iceland ==
On 12 January 1830, the last execution in Iceland was staged at three hills called Þrístapar in the northernmost reach of the Vatnsdalshólar. Sentenced to death for the 14 March 1828 murder of Natan Ketilsson and Pétur Jónsson, Friðrik Sigurðsson and Agnes Magnúsdóttir were executed by beheading. Their bodies were buried at the site and their heads displayed on pikes until they were later reburied at the cemetery of the Tjarnarkirkja on the western Vatnsnes. The execution block and axe can be seen at the National Museum in Reykjavik.

The execution has been the subjects of several creative works, including the novel Yfirvaldið ('The Authority') by Þorgeir Þorgeirsson, published in Icelandic in 1973, and the 1996 film Agnes, directed by Egill Eðvarðsson. Australian author Hannah Kent wrote the internationally successful novel Burial Rites, a fictionalized account of the last year of Agnes’ life as she awaited execution. Originally published in 2013, the book has since been translated into 30 languages. Kent was first introduced to the event and the people involved while living in Iceland as an exchange student for a year as a teen.

== Gallery ==
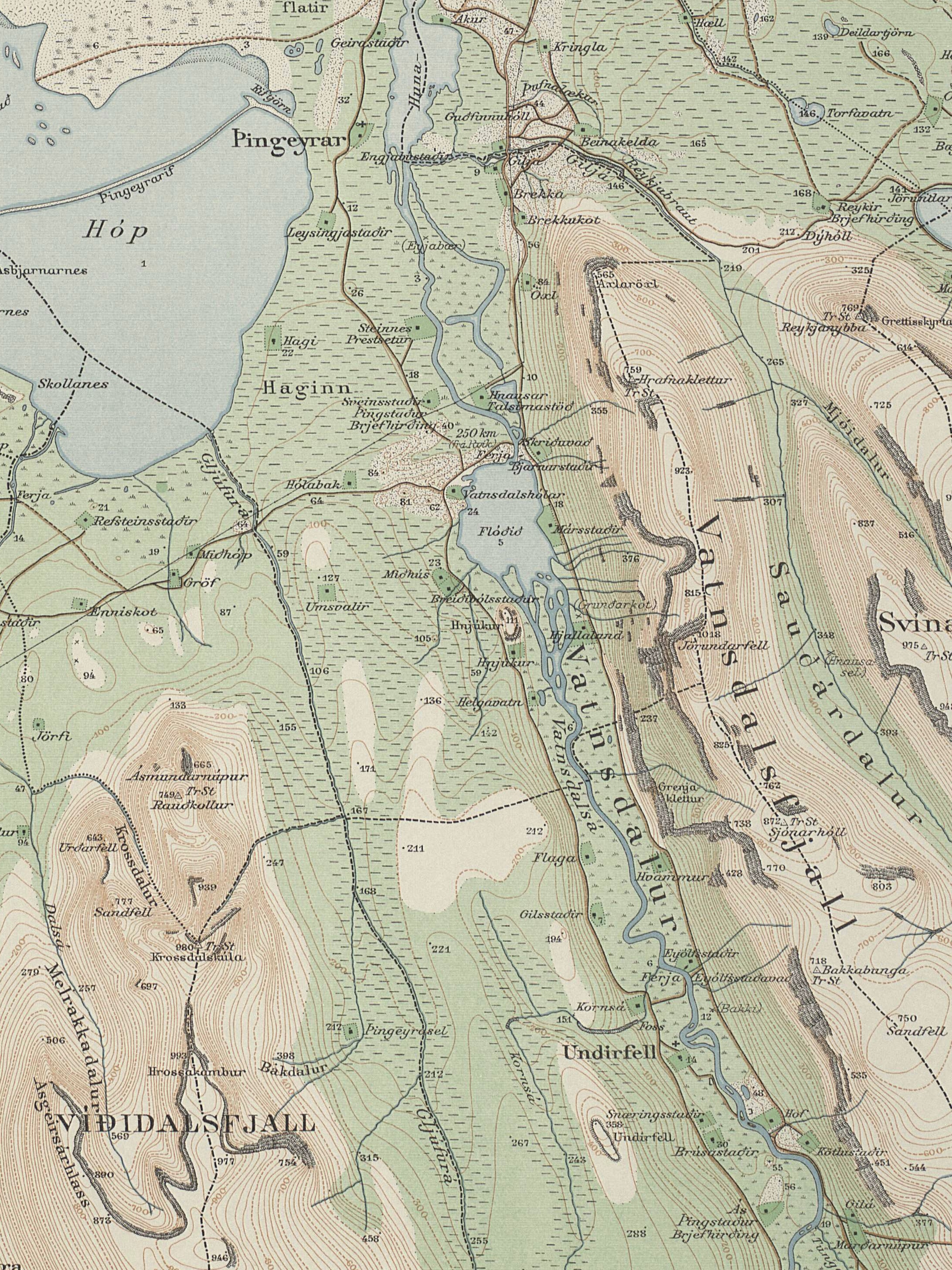
Topographic map of Vatnsdalur and surrounding area in 1921

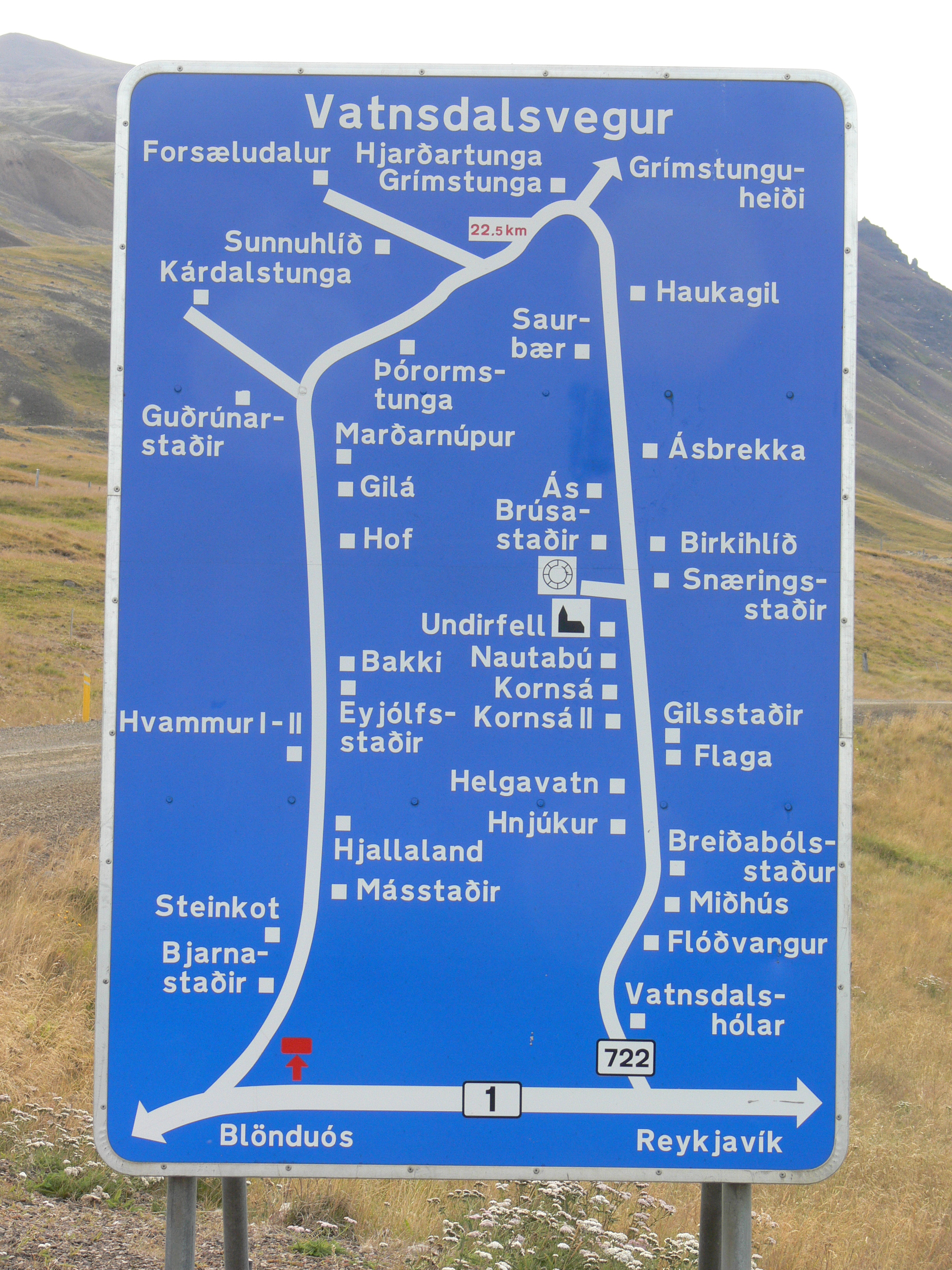
Road sign showing locations along the Vatnsdalsvegur, which loops south of Route 1

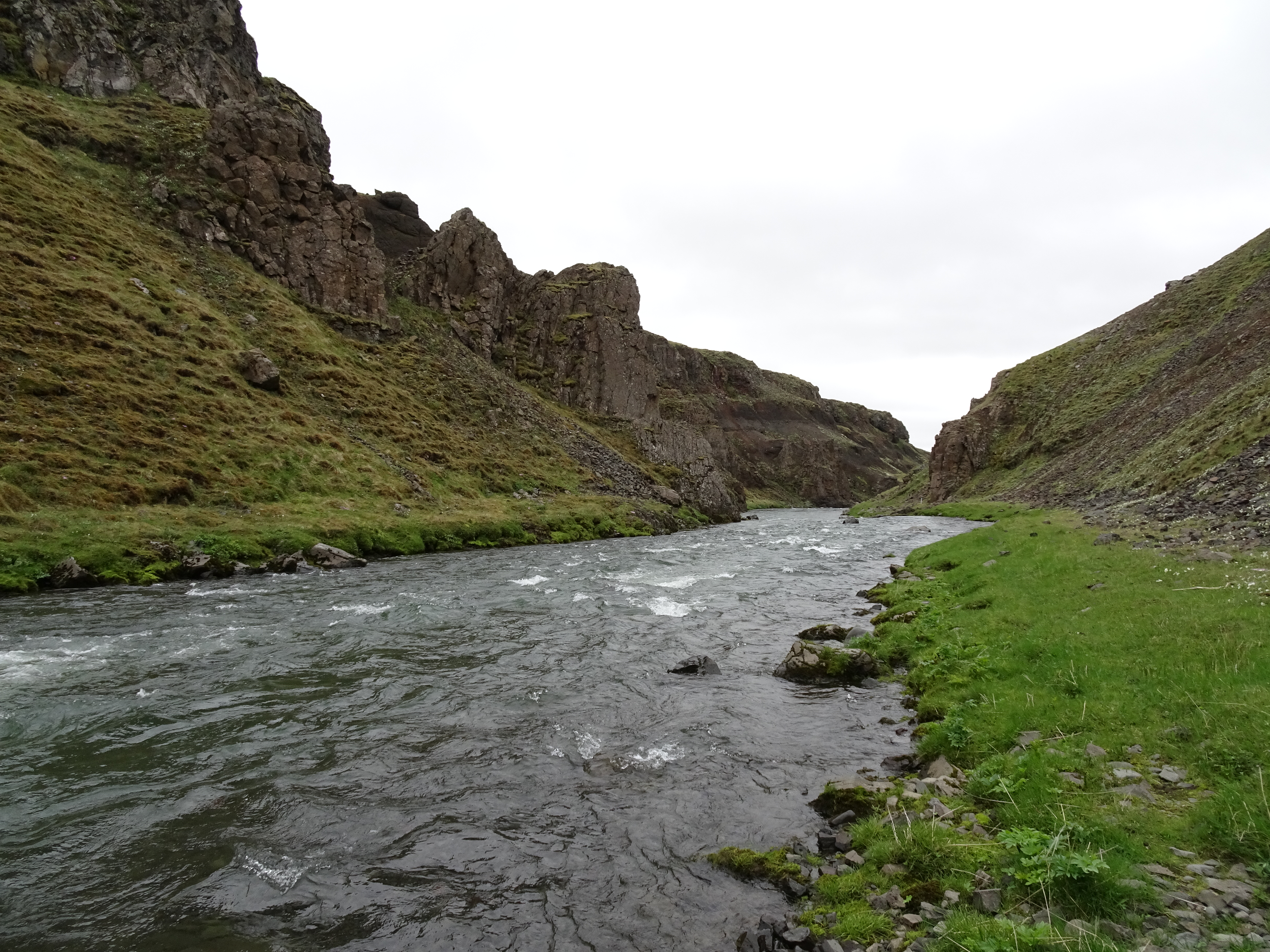
Vatnsdalsá

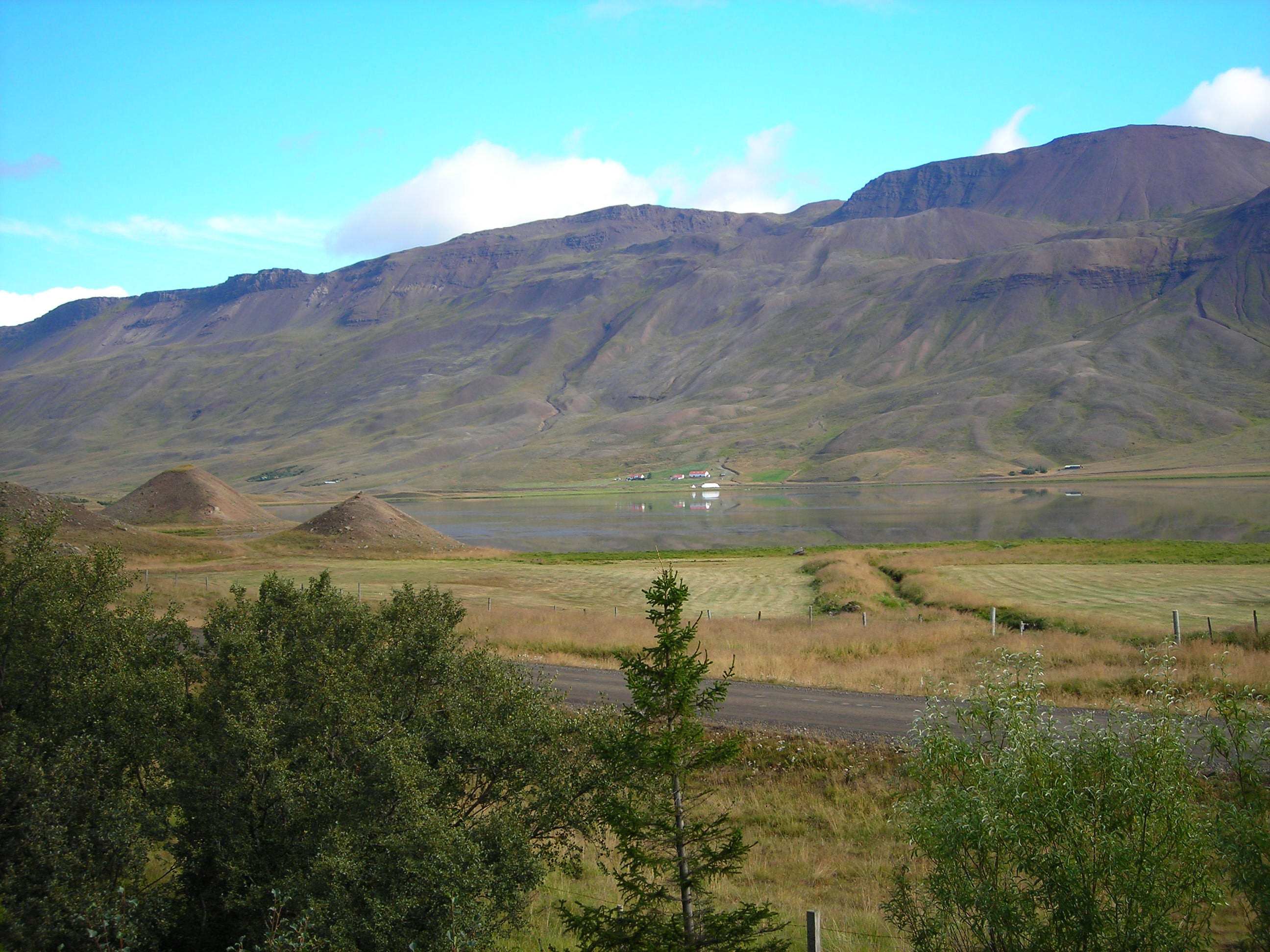
Flóðið and some mounds of the Vatnsdalshólar (left), with the steep incline of Vatnsdalsfjall in the background

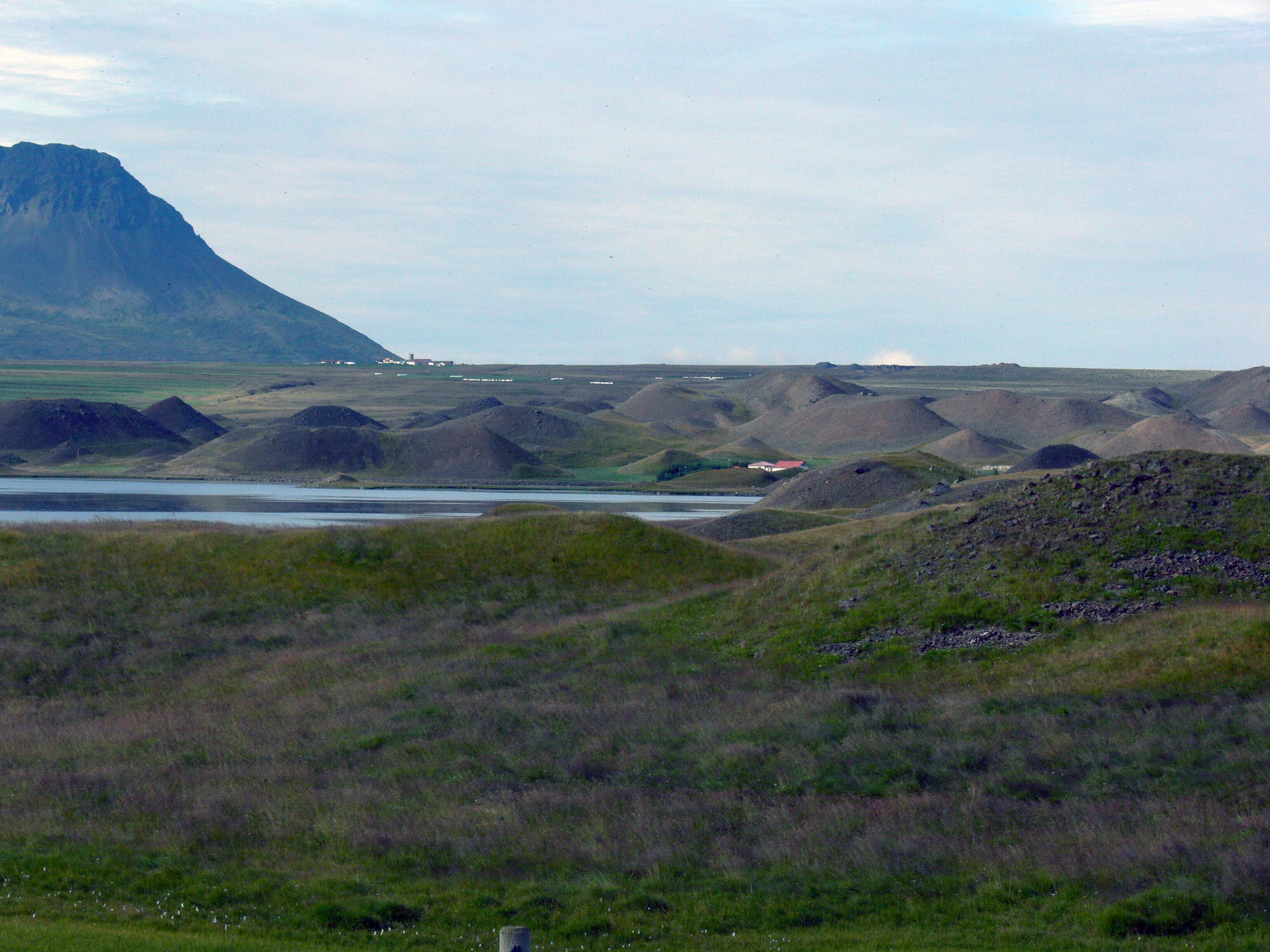
Some Vatnsdalshólar on the shore of the Flóðið

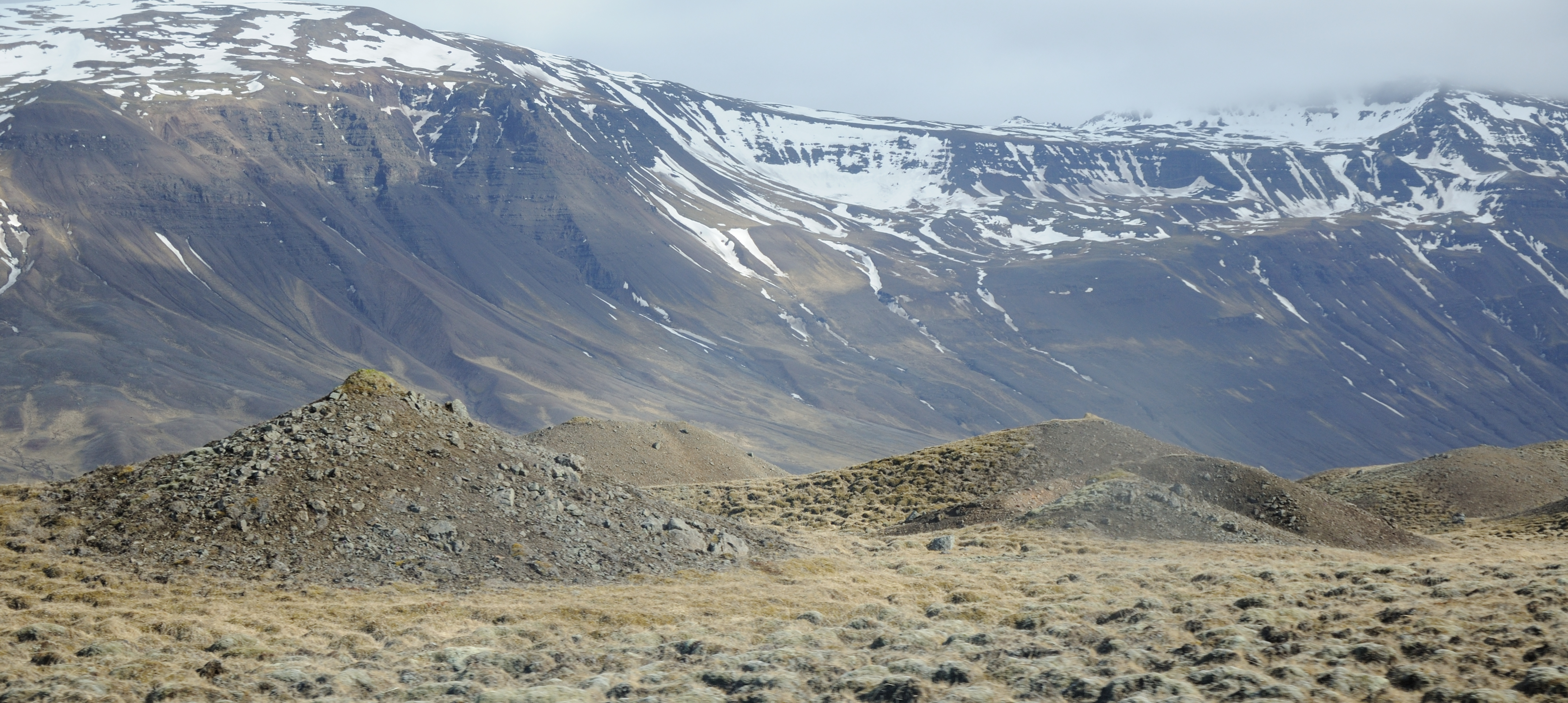
Some mounds of the Vatnsdalshólar, with Vatnsdalsfjall in the background

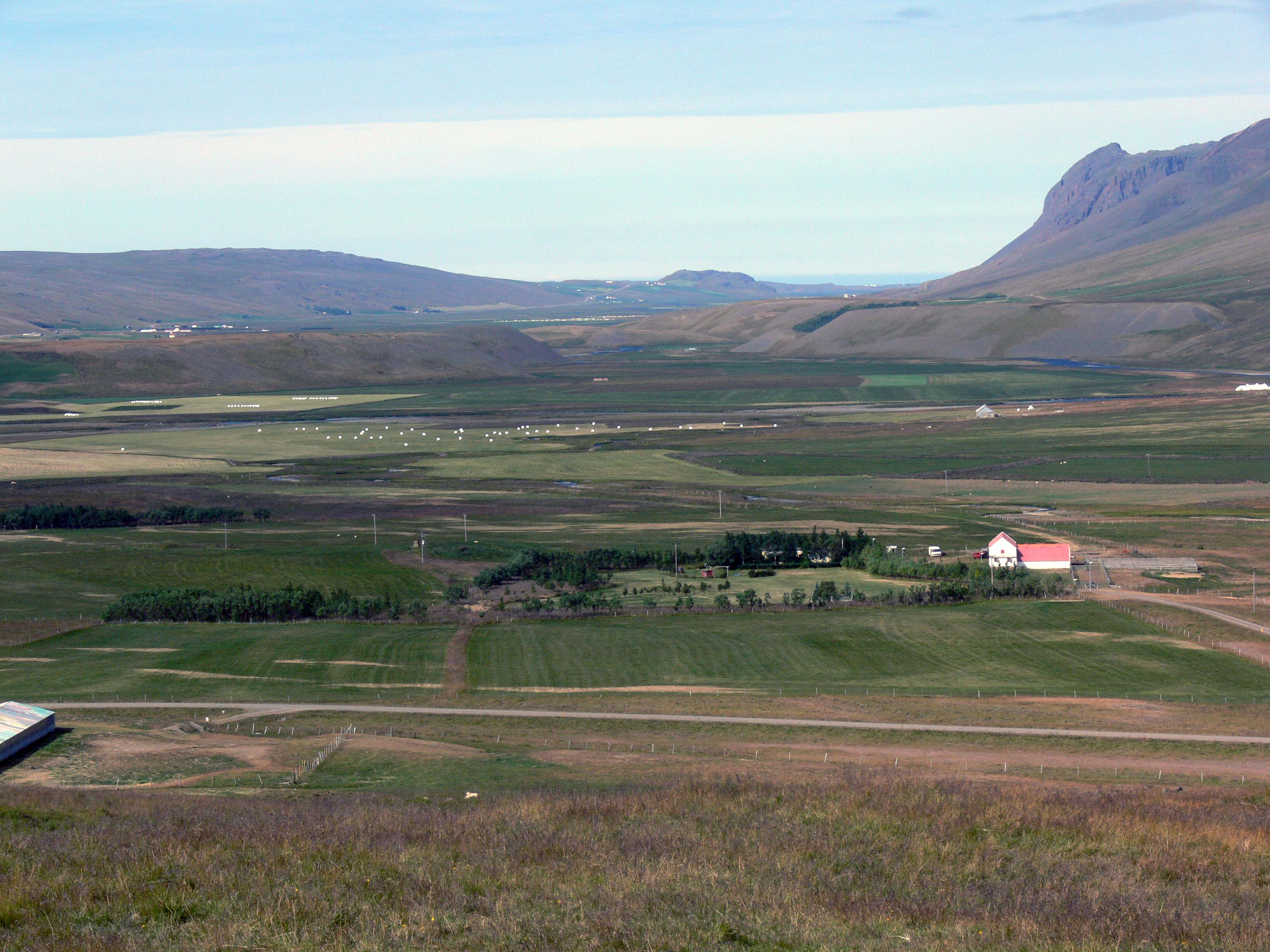
Jökulstaðir, the farm where Jökull Ingimundarsson is said to have settled

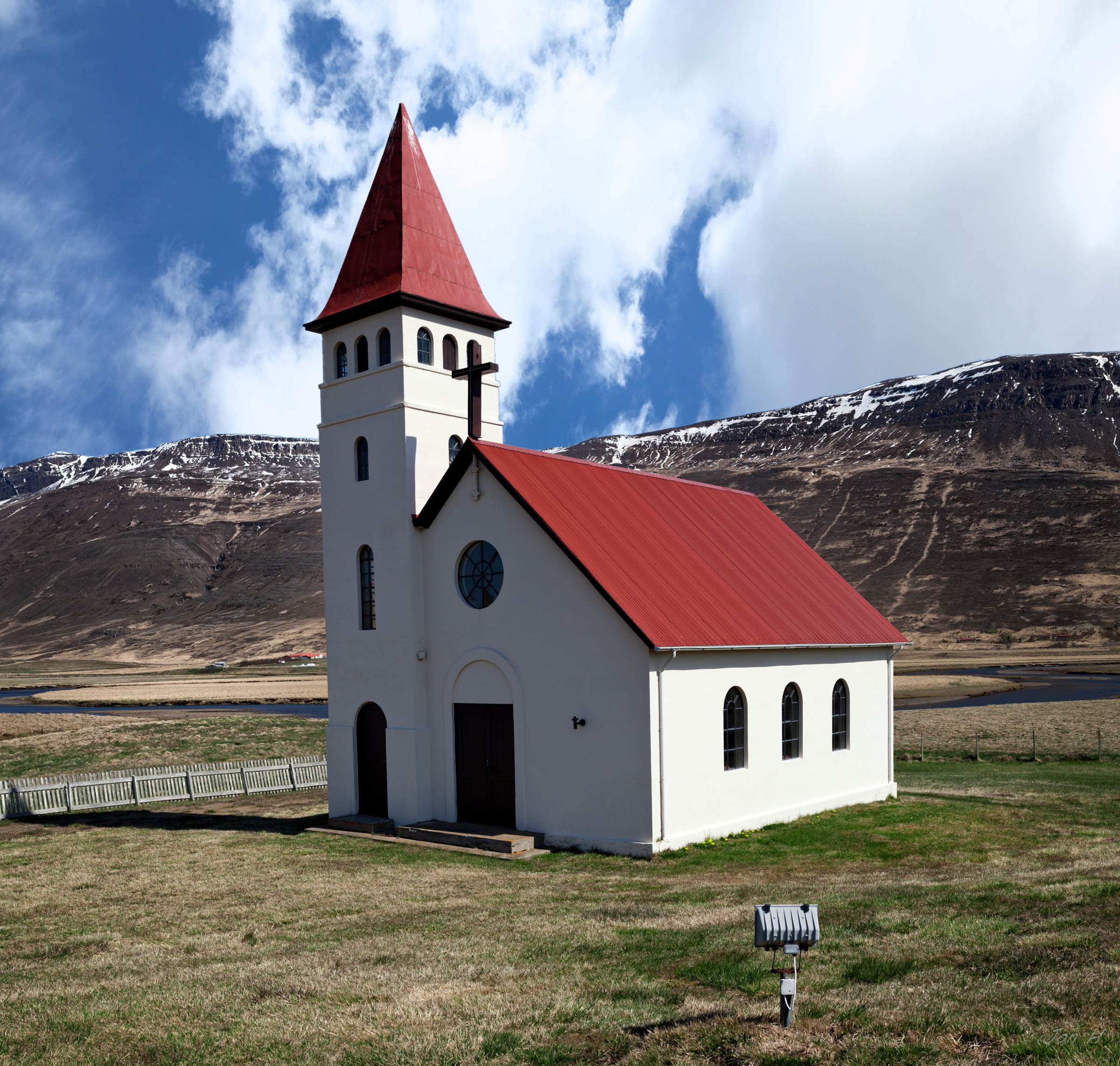
Undirfellskirkja

== See also ==
- List of fjords in Iceland
- List of lakes in Iceland
- Old Norse literature
