= Vatnsdæla saga =

Icelandic saga

Vatnsdæla saga (Icelandic: [ˈvassˌdaiːla ˌsaːɣa];; Old Norse: Vatnsdœla saga) is one of the sagas of Icelanders. The saga follows several generations of a family originating in Norway and settling in the north of Iceland until the arrival of Christianity in the late tenth century.

== Manuscripts and dating ==
A fragment of Vatnsdæla saga is preserved in a late-14th or early-15th-century manuscript (AM 445 b 4to). Complete versions of the text are preserved in later paper manuscripts including AM 559 4to, written between 1686 and 1688, and AM 942 4to, written between 1700 and 1782. These texts likely originate from a 14th-century source, while the saga may have originally been written in the late 13th century.

== Synopsis ==
Vatnsdæla Saga is essentially a family chronicle. It relates to residents of Vatnsdalur, a valley that runs south from Húnaflói, a large bay in the north of Iceland. The principal protagonist is a man named Ingimundr Þorsteinsson who fought for King Harald Fairhair of Norway at the Battle of Hafrsfjord winning his friendship and an amulet. At the instigation of a sorceress, he moved to Iceland to settle at Vatnsdalur in Húnaþing.

== Other sources ==
- Jane Smiley (2001) The Sagas of the Icelanders (Penguin Classics) ISBN 978-0141000039
