= Death of Michael Leahy =

Death of a child believed to be a changeling by his killers

Michael Leahy
- Born: 1822; County Kerry, Ireland
- Died: 1826 (aged 3–4); County Kerry, Ireland
- Cause of death: Drowning
- Known for: Being drowned for supposedly being a changeling

Michael Leahy was a child who died by drowning in 1826 in County Kerry, Ireland. Leahy was four years old at the time of his death. He was believed by some in his community to have been a changeling and the drowning was the result of an attempt to cure him.

Ann Roche was indicted for Leahy's murder and tried in Tralee. Roche was described by the London Morning Post as being "an old woman of very advanced age". She claimed to have supernatural abilities and healing skills. She ordered two people to bathe the boy in the river Flesk every morning. The two bathed him for three mornings. On the third morning he was held under the water for longer than usual and died.

== Mythological background ==
A changeling was a child left by fairies after they had stolen a healthy human child. The suspicion in Leahy's case resulted from his illness. He could neither speak nor stand. Under cross-examination a witness said that the drowning was not done with the intent of killing the child but to cure him – "to put the fairy out of it".

== Legal verdict ==
The court, at the direction of the judge, found Roche not guilty of murder. The judge said that the jury "would not be safe in convicting the prisoner of murder, however strong their suspicion might be". Author Robert Curran says that the verdict is suggestive of the depth of belief in changelings in the community. There were several similar cases in rural Ireland in the 19th century.

== Popular culture ==
Hannah Kent's novel, The Good People, takes inspiration from this case. Kent said that she could find only two primary source articles on the case after extensive research and many details about the case are unknown.

== See also ==
- Bridget Cleary – an Irish woman killed by her husband in 1895. Her husband claimed that she was a changeling.
