= Vatnsdalshólar =

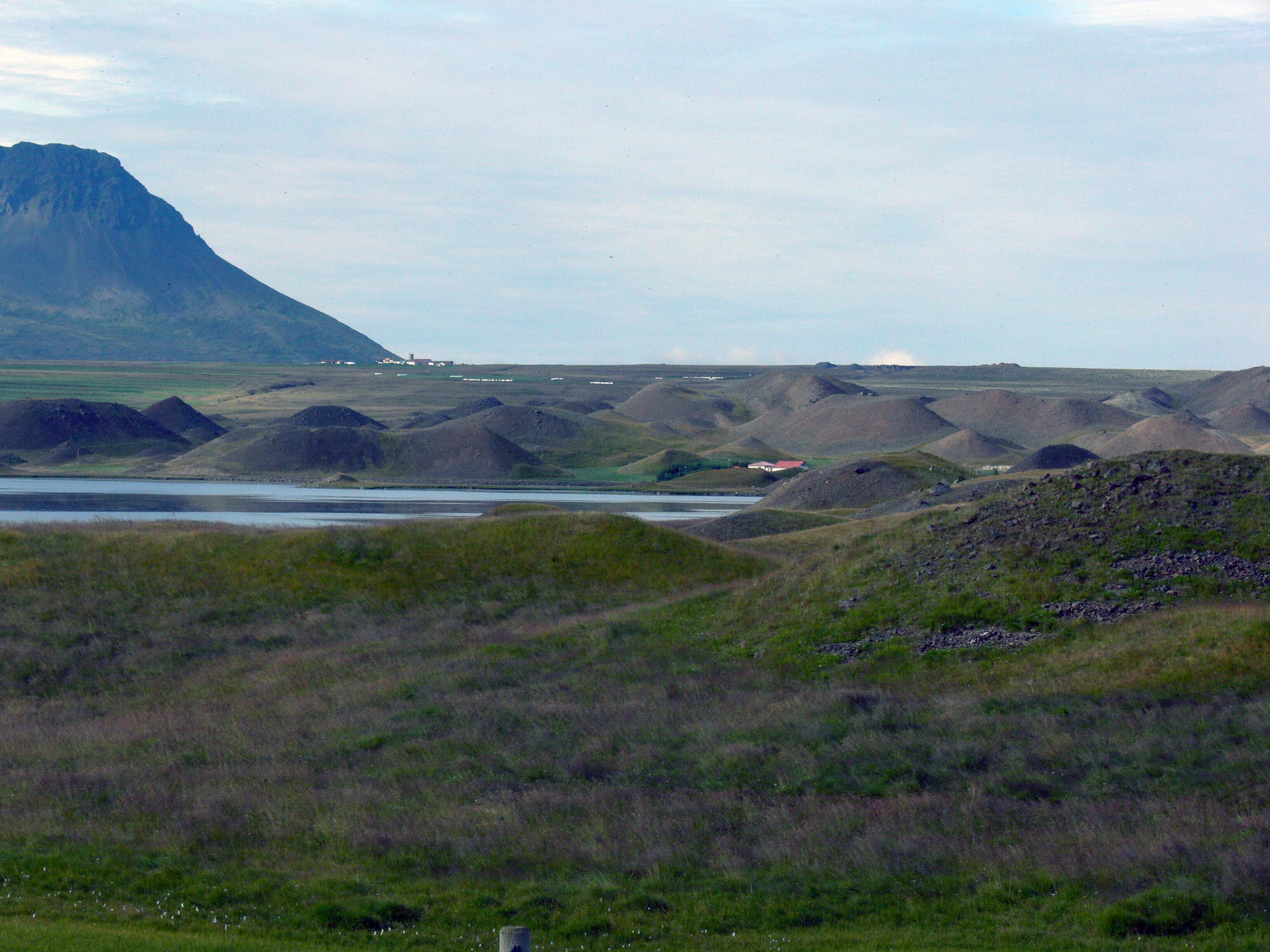
- Some of the hills

Highest point
- Elevation: 83 m (272 ft)
- Listing: Breast-shaped hills
- Coordinates: 65°30′N 20°22′W

Geography
- Location within Iceland
- Location: Húnavatnshreppur, NW Region, Iceland

Vatnsdalshólar ("Vatnsdalskullarna") is a hill group located in the Northwestern Region, Iceland. They are located at the northern end of Vatnsdalur in an area measuring approximately 5.5 km^{2}.

Landslides are common in Vatnsdalur valley, especially near the Vatnsdalshólar hills, which are composed of loose stone and gravel.

Vatnsdalshólar was the site of Iceland's last executed capital punishment on January 12, 1830 with the beheading of farm servants Agnes Magnúsdóttir (33) and Friðrik Sigurdsson (19). They were accused of the murder of two farmers on March 14, 1828: Natan Ketilsson from Illugastaðir, and Pétur Jónsson from Geitaskarð. After a long trial heard by the Supreme Court in Copenhagen, the pair were sentenced to be executed.

== See also ==
- Breast-shaped hill
- Capital punishment in Iceland
