= River Flesk =

River in County Kerry, Ireland

The River Flesk (Irish: An Fhleisc) is a river in County Kerry, Ireland. It is 28 miles (45 km) long and drains into Lough Leane at Killarney. The river gets a run of spring salmon early in the season, and the grilse run in late May and early June.

In 1826, a four year old boy, Michael Leahy, was drowned in the river as some in the local community suspected him to have been a changeling.
