= Laugarnes =

Coordinates: 64°9′0.5″N 21°52′19″W

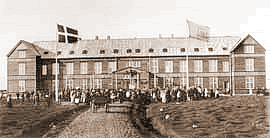
The Leper Hospital at Laugarnes, Reykjavík Iceland. The hospital was built in 1898 and was the biggest house in Iceland the hospital burned down in 1943

Reykjavík map, Laugarnes is on the shore nearest part to the island Viðey

Laugarnes (Icelandic pronunciation: [ˈlœyːɣarˌnɛːs]) is a quarter in Reykjavík, Iceland. It contains a historic site were the remains of a large farm mound are still visible.

== Overview ==
Laugarnes was probably first occupied in the settlement period of Iceland. The site also contains a church ruin and a graveyard that was abandoned in 1791. Later the Bishop of Iceland had his residence in Laugarnes (1826–1856) and in 1898 a leper hospital was erected there. During World War II a military camp was set up in Laugarnes. The museum of sculptor Sigurjón Ólafsson in Laugarnes was built on the site of one of its barracks. Laugarnes is on the Icelandic Nature Conservation Register and its shores are protected.

== Sources ==
- Árbók hins íslenska fornleifafélags, 93. volume, page 150
