= Steingrímur Thorsteinsson =

Icelandic poet and writer (1831–1913)

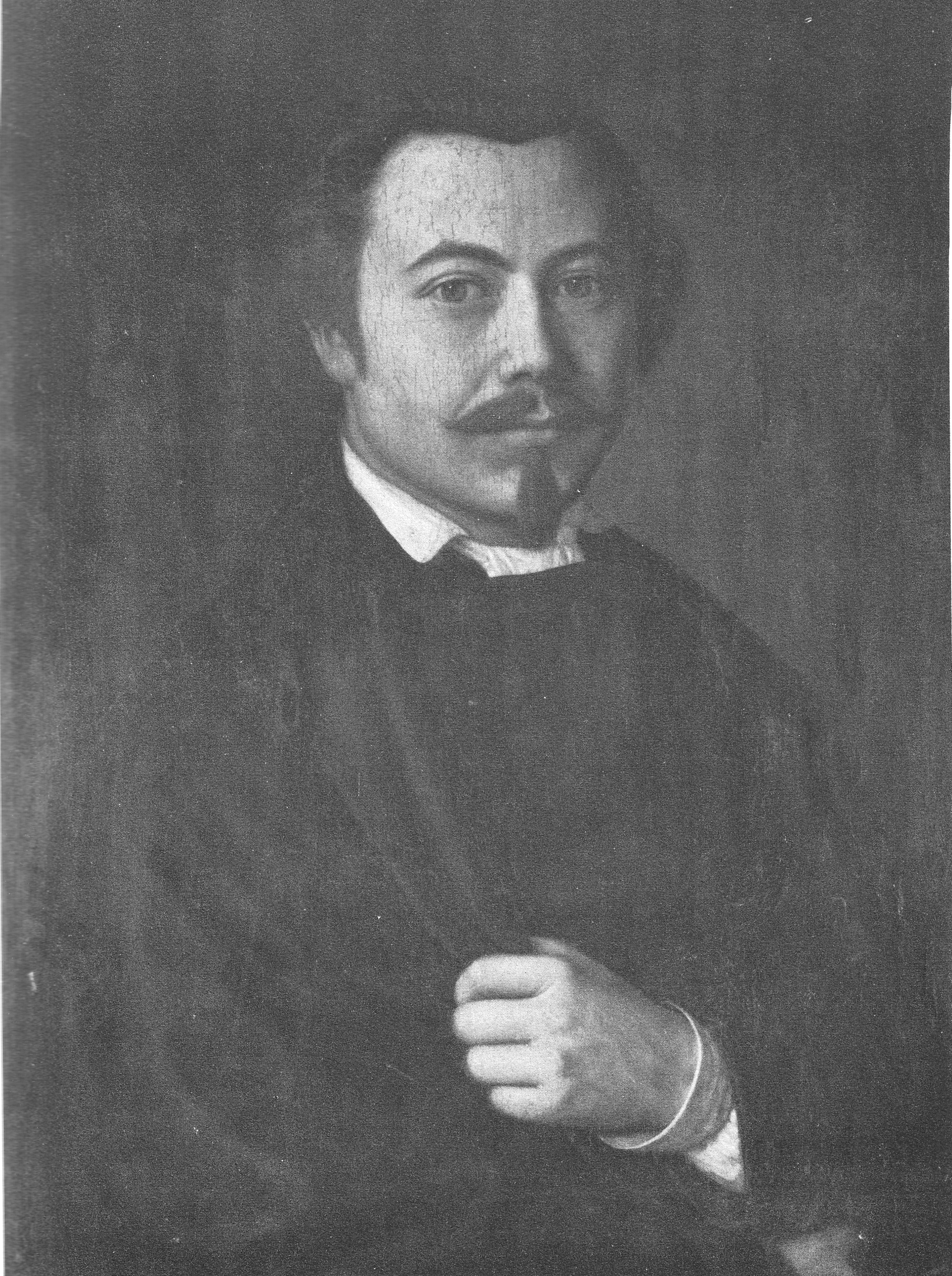
A portrait of Steingrímur Thorsteinson by Sigurður málari.

Steingrímur Thorsteinsson (19 May, 1831 – 21 August, 1913) was an Icelandic poet and writer. He translated many works of literature into Icelandic, including Arabian Nights and the fairy tales of Hans Christian Andersen.
