= Lárus Blöndal =

Icelandic sýslumaður and politician

Lárus Þórarinn Blöndal Björnsson
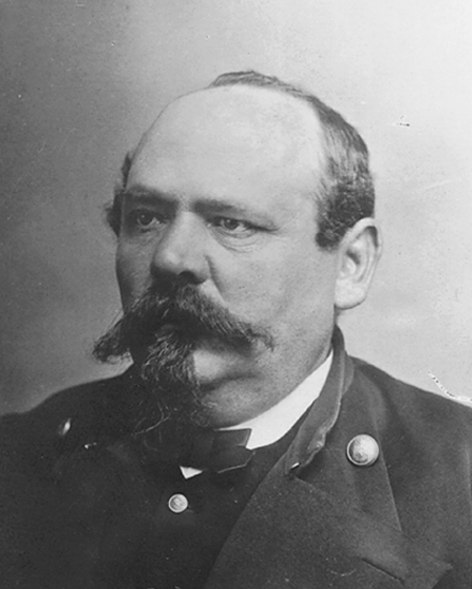
- A portrait of Lárus taken between 1850–1870

Sýslumaður in Dalasýslu 1867–1877
- In office 1867–1877

Sýslumaður in Barðastrandarsýsla
- In office 1870–1871

Sýslumaður in Húnavatnssýslu
- In office 1877–1894

Personal details
- Born: 16 November 1836 Hvammur, Vatnsdal, Iceland
- Died: 12 May 1894 (aged 57)
- Resting place: Undirfellskirkjugarður
- Spouse: Kristín Blöndal Ásgeirsdóttir
- Children: 11 including Haraldur Blöndal Lárusson
- Parent: Björn Blöndal
- Education: University of Copenhagen (Hafnarskóli)
- Profession: Lawyer

Lárus Þórarinn Blöndal Björnsson was an Icelandic sýslumaður and alþingismaður. He served as Vice President of Alþingi in 1833, and as Alþingismaður Húnvetninga from 1880 to 1885.

== Personal life ==
Lárus was the son of Björn Blöndal who famously presided over the case of Agnes and Friðrik, and father in law to Jóhannes Jóhannesson, speaker of Alþingi between 1918–1921 and 1924–1926.
