= Nathan Ketilsson =

Icelandic physician (1792–1828)

Nathan or Natan Ketilsson (1792 – 14 March 1828) was an Icelandic self-taught medical doctor who last lived at Illugastaðir in Vatnsnes in Vestur-Húnavatnssýsla and was murdered there along with another man. His killers, Agnes Magnúsdóttir and Friðrik Sigurðsson were the last people to be executed in Iceland.

Nathan was born in Hólabær in Langidalur, the son of Ketil Eyjólfsson and Guðrún Hallsdóttir.

== The murder ==
On the evening of March 13, 1828, Friðrik came to Illugastaður and had the two maids, Agnes and Sigríði, hide in a barn until Nathan and Pétur Jónsson, who was a night visitor to the farm, were asleep. When the men were asleep, Agnes and Friðrik went into the baðstofa (the main living space of the house) where the two men were sleeping and Friðrik killed them both with a knife. It is not known whether Sigríður took part in the murder itself, but before Friðrik and Agnes set the baðstofa on fire, she stole what was considered valuable. On the night of March 14, local people woke up in the town of Stapakoti in Vatnsneswhen Agnes was there with the news. She said that Illugastaðir was engulfed in light flames and that the owner of the farm, Nathan, was burned inside together with Pétur Jónsson. But when the fire was put out and the bodies were found, it turned out that it was not an accident.
