= Hannah Kent =

Australian writer (born 1985)

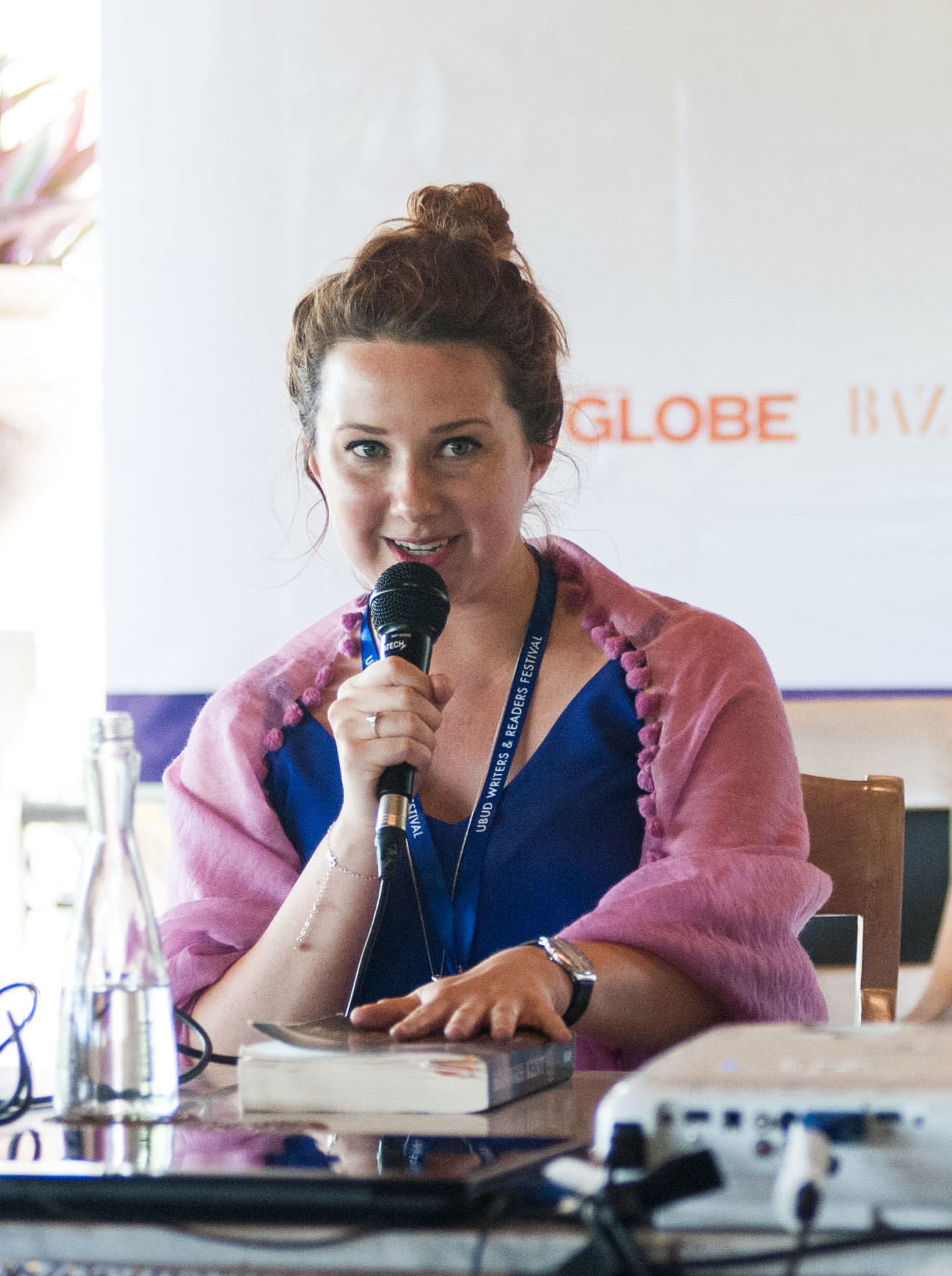
- Kent at the Ubud Writers & Readers Festival in Bali, Indonesia, October 2016
- Born: 1985 (age 40–41); Adelaide, South Australia
- Education: Flinders University
- Occupation: Writer
- Writing career
- Genres: Literary fiction, historical fiction
- Website: hannahkentauthor.com

Hannah Kent (born 1985) is an Australian author, author of the novels Burial Rites (2013), The Good People (2016), and Devotion (2021), as well as a memoir, Always Home, Always Homesick (2025).

== Early life and education ==
Hannah Kent was born in 1985 and grew up in the Adelaide Hills of South Australia. As a four-year-old she had no friends, but found solace in discovering and reading books.

She attended Heathfield High School in Heathfield. In 2003, after finishing school and having applied for a course in creative writing course at Flinders University, she spent a year away in Iceland as a Rotary International exchange student.

She earned a PhD in creative writing at Flinders University, her thesis being the basis of her first novel, Burial Rites.

== Career ==
=== Kill Your Darlings ===
In 2010, Kent co-founded the Australian literary journal Kill Your Darlings with Rebecca Starford.

=== Novels ===
In 2011 Kent won the inaugural Writing Australia Unpublished Manuscript Award for her novel Burial Rites. Burial Rites tells the story of Agnes Magnúsdóttir, a servant in northern Iceland who was condemned to death after the murder of two men, one of whom was her employer, and became the last woman put to death in Iceland. Kent was drawn to the idea of writing her story after a visit to the scene of the woman's execution at Þrístapar, close to where she stayed for some time as a Rotary exchange student when she was 18. The novel crafts a more ambiguous, sympathetic image of the life of a woman widely regarded in popular opinion to have been "an inhumane witch, stirring up murder". In 2017, it was announced that Jennifer Lawrence would play the role of Agnes in the film adaptation of Burial Rites, directed by Luca Guadagnino. As of May 2025 the film is still "in development".

A documentary about Kent's experiences in Iceland and writing Burial Rites was aired on the ABC TV as an episode of Australian Story titled "No More Than a Ghost", on 1 July 2013.

Kent's second novel, The Good People, was published in 2016. Set in Ireland's County Kerry in 1825, it is the story of a widow's struggle to find a cure for her grandson who has been struck down by a mysterious inability to speak and who is feared by others in this superstitious community as a changeling. The novel takes inspiration from the case of the death of Michael Leahy. It was translated into ten languages and shortlisted for the Walter Scott Award for Historical Fiction (UK) 2017. In 2020 Aquarius Films planned to adapt The Good People for the screen.

Her third novel, Devotion (2021), set in a fictionalised version of the Adelaide Hills town of Hahndorf, is an historical love story between two young Lutheran women set in the 1830s, "unfurling in a time that doesn't have the language for it". The novel takes place in their Prussian homeland and the new colony of South Australia.

=== Screenwriting ===
Kent had been thinking of writing a novel based on a true story about a Scottish child who remembered a past life, and she started researching similar incidences. When film producers Anna McLeish and Sarah Shaw asked if she had any ideas for a screenplay, she suggested using such a storyline as a kind of psychological drama. Kent was interested in imagining "what it would be like to be a parent of this child... in the mother and the alienation she would feel when a child didn't want her". In 2020 it was announced that Elisabeth Moss would star in the film, titled Run Rabbit Run, and Daina Reid would direct. In December 2021, Sarah Snook replaced Moss as the star. The film, which developed into a horror film, was released by Netflix on 28 June 2023 in the United States, Australia, the United Kingdom and other territories.

=== Memoir ===
Kent's memoir, entitled Always Home, Always Homesick, was published on 29 April 2025. The first part covers her early childhood through to her time in Iceland as an exchange student in 2003, while the second part is about her return to the country aged in her twenties, when she started researching and writing about Agnes Magnúsdóttir, the last person to be executed there (the subject of Burial Rites). The third part covers a more recent trip, when she visited the site of Magnúsdóttir's execution, now a memorial, and found that plaques engraved with lines from her novel had been installed.

After publication of her memoir, she said in an interview:

Writing has always been the way I make sense of the world... For the first time in my life I began to really reflect on how much that first trip to Iceland affected the trajectory of my career and also how much it has shaped me as a person.

== Awards and honours ==
=== Burial Rites ===
- Winner of the FAW Christina Stead Award 2013
- Winner of the ABA Nielsen Bookdata Bookseller's Choice Award 2014
- Winner of the Booktopia People's Choice Award 2014
- Winner of the ABIA Literary Fiction Book of the Year 2014
- Winner of the Davitt Awards Best Debut Novel 2014
- Winner of the Davitt Awards Reader's Choice 2014
- Winner of the Indie Books Award for Debut Fiction of the Year 2014
- Winner of the Sydney Morning Herald Best Young Australian Novelist 2014
- Winner of the Victorian Premier's Literary Awards People's Choice Award 2014
- Winner of the Prix Critiqueslibres Decouvrir Étranger 2017
- Shortlisted for the ALS Gold Medal 2014
- Shortlisted for the Baileys Women's Prize for Fiction 2014
- Shortlisted for the Guardian First Book Award 2013
- Shortlisted for the NIB Waverley Award for Literature 2013
- Shortlisted for the National Book Awards International Author of the Year 2014
- Shortlisted for the Stella Prize 2014
- Shortlisted for the Voss Literary Prize 2014
- Shortlisted for the Victorian Premier's Prize for Fiction 2014
- Shortlisted for the International Dublin Literary Award 2015

=== The Good People ===
- Shortlisted for the ABIA Literary Fiction Book of the Year Award 2017
- Shortlisted for the Indie Books Award for Literary Fiction 2017
- Shortlisted for the Queensland Literary Award for Fiction 2017
- Shortlisted for the Readings Prize for New Australian Fiction 2017
- Shortlisted for the Walter Scott Prize 2017

=== Devotion ===
- Shortlisted for the Indie Book Award for Fiction 2022
- Shortlisted for the Prime Minister's Literary Award for Fiction 2022

=== Always Home, Always Homesick ===
- Winner, Indie Book Awards for Non-Fiction 2026
- Shortlisted, Douglas Stewart Prize for Nonfiction, New South Wales Premier's Literary Awards 2026

== Personal life ==
Kent lives in the Adelaide Hills with her wife, Heidi, and their two young children.

== Biblio ==
=== Novels ===
- Burial Rites (2013)
- The Good People (2016)
- Devotion (2021)

=== Memoir ===
- Always Home, Always Homesick (2025)
