= Burial Rites =

Novel by Hannah Kent

- First edition (Australia)
- Author: Hannah Kent
- Language: English
- Genre: Novel
- Publisher: Pan Macmillan (AUS); Little, Brown (US); Picador (UK)
- Publication date: 2013
- Publication place: Australia
- Media type: Print (Paperback)
- Pages: 338
- ISBN: 9781742612829

Burial Rites (2013) is a novel by Australian author Hannah Kent, based on a true story about the last woman to be executed in Iceland.

== Premise ==
Burial Rites tells the story of Agnes Magnúsdóttir, a servant in northern Iceland who was condemned to death after the murder of two men, one of whom was her employer, and became the last woman put to death in Iceland in 1830.

== Background ==
Kent was inspired to write Burial Rites during her time as an exchange student in Iceland when she was 17, where she learnt the story of Agnes Magnúsdóttir. She then made it the topic of her honours thesis and PhD at Flinders University, with additional mentoring by Geraldine Brooks. After this, Kent was awarded the Writing Australia Unpublished Manuscript Award in 2011.

== Publication ==
Burial Rites was published in 2013 by Pan Macmillan in Australia, by Little, Brown in the US, and by Picador in the UK.

== Reviews ==
Burial Rites was well-received by critics and other writers. English novelist Sarah Moss, writing in The Guardian, called the novel "beautiful and compelling", and that Kent was a writer to watch. Ben Etherington wrote in the Sydney Review of Books that the novel was a "big book", and mentioned good reviews by The New York Times and by Michael McGirr in The Sydney Morning Herald and The Age, among others. He wrote that the novel had had good reviews in the UK by The Observer, The Telegraph, Daily Express, and The Sunday Times.

Stephen Romei, literary editor of The Australian, who spoke to Kent about what led her to write the novel, drew a parallel between Burial Rites and Hilary Mantel trilogy of novels about Tudor England. He also wrote "Kent's affinity for the landscape resounds on every page of Burial Rites".

== Film adaptation ==
In 2017, it was announced that Luca Guadagnino would direct a film adaptation starring Jennifer Lawrence. As of May 2025 the film is still "in development".

== School curricula use ==
Burial Rites was included in the Victorian Certificate of Education text response texts from 2014, and in the Queensland Curriculum and Assessment Authority prescribed text list in 2020.

== Literary awards ==
Year	Award	Category	Result	Ref.
2011	Writing Australia Unpublished Manuscript Award	—	Won	
2013	Guardian First Book Award	—	Shortlisted	
2013	Nib Literary Award	—	Shortlisted	
2013	Nib Literary Award	The Alex Buzo Shortlist Prize	Won	
2014	ALS Gold Medal	—	Shortlisted	
2014	Australian Book Industry Awards	Australian Literary Fiction Book of the Year	Won	
2014	Australian Book Industry Awards	Booktopia People's Choice Award	Won	
2014	National Book Awards (UK)	International Author of the Year	Shortlisted	
2014	Davitt Award	Adult Crime Novel	Shortlisted	
2014	Davitt Award	Debut Crime Novel	Won	
2014	Davitt Award	Readers' Choice Award	Won	
2014	Indie Book Awards (AUS)	Debut Fiction	Won	
2014	Nielsen BookData Booksellers Choice Award	—	Won	
2014	Stella Prize	—	Shortlisted	
2014	Victorian Premier's Literary Awards	Fiction	Shortlisted	
2014	Victorian Premier's Literary Awards	People's Choice Award	Won	
2014	Voss Literary Prize	—	Shortlisted	
2014	Women's Prize for Fiction	—	Shortlisted	
2015	International Dublin Literary Award	—	Shortlisted	
