= Sýslumaður =

Governmental office in Iceland, Faroes, and Svalbard

Sýslumaður (Icelandic pronunciation: [ˈsistlʏˌmaːðʏr̥]; plural: sýslumenn [ˈsistlʏˌmɛnː]; Old Norse: sýslumaðr [ˈsyːsloˌmɑðr], Norwegian: sysselmann, Danish: sysselmænd) is a governmental office or title used in Iceland, the Faroe Islands, and Norway.

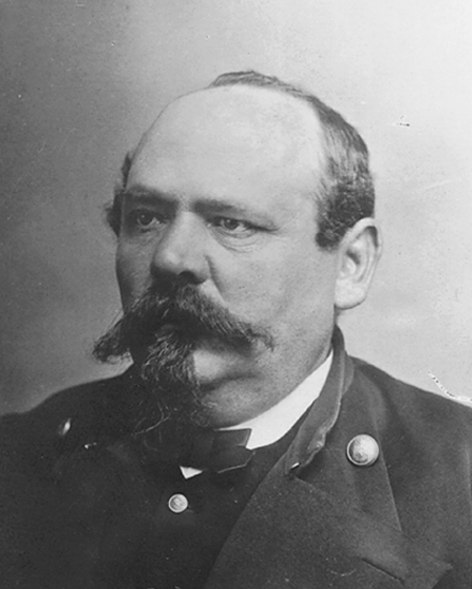
Lárus Blöndal, Icelandic sýslumaður and politician

The position originated in Norway in the Middle Ages, where it was used as a noble title, and the sýslumaður was granted a fief called a sýsla (plural: sýslur) in which he was responsible for collecting tolls, taxes and fines, upholding the law and military defences. He was also to hold courts of justice and name men to sit on juries. He sometimes also assigned fiefs to a lensmann. The system was established in the 12th century by Sverre of Norway to help consolidate his power following the Battle of Fimreite. As Norse influence spread, so did the sýslumaður system, reaching into Iceland and the Faroe Islands, as well as Orkney and Shetland.

Today, a sýslumaður or sysselmann (often translated into English as "district commissioner", "sheriff", "magistrate", or "governor") handles a variety of governmental responsibilities in Iceland, the Faroe Islands, and the Svalbard archipelago in Norway.

== Iceland ==
The office of sýslumaður was established in Iceland when the country submitted to the King of Norway in 1262–1264 and royal authority was invested in sýslumenn to oversee the island's 12 sýslur. Appointed by the King of Norway, it was possible for a single sýslumaður to oversee up to a quarter of the island through representatives stationed through his assigned sýslur. In 1375 a group of prominent Icelanders declared they would no longer accept non-native sýslumenn, nor royal amendments not sanctioned by the Alþingi.

Currently there are nine district commissioners that manage several types of public services in their districts, including collecting taxes outside of the capital area, handling civil marriages, inheritance, child custody and issuing various permits.

== Faroe Islands ==
As in Iceland, the sýslumaður system was brought to the Faroe Islands in the 13th century as the Norwegian king exerted greater influence over the islands. Traditionally, there were six sýslumenn, one for each sýsla.

Today, sýslumenn are the modern district sheriffs appointed to three-year terms. In line with Danish police reform efforts, as of 1 January 2009, the number of sýslumenn was reduced to four, overseeing three police districts. Initially, the Danish National Police wanted to stop using the term sýslumaður, but it was deemed not possible as the sýslumenn are more than police, performing a range of tasks for the Faroese government, the courts, and the Danish High Commissioner.

One of the tasks of the sýslumaður is to decide whether or not a pod of pilot whales that has been spotted should be slaughtered and, if so, into which bay the boats should drive the pod. This is decided together with the grindaformenn, who leads the pilot whale hunt.

== Svalbard ==
In Norway, the term sysselmann is used for the Governor of Svalbard; however, after 1 July 2021, it was replaced by the gender-neutral term sysselmester as part of Norwegian efforts to ensure that governmental terms are not distinctly masculine or feminine. In English, both sysselmann and sysselmester are translated as "governor".

From 1931 to 1933, the term sysselmann was also used for the governor of Erik the Red's Land, Norway's claim on eastern Greenland.
