= Agnes Magnúsdóttir =

Icelandic convicted murderer

- Born: 27 October 1795; Iceland
- Died: 12 January 1830 (aged 34); Vatnsdalshólar, Austur-Húnavatnssýsla, Iceland
- Occupation: Servant
- Status: Executed by beheading
- Conviction: Guilty on all charges
- Criminal charge: Murder (2 counts)
- Penalty: Capital punishment

Details
- Victims: Nathan Ketilsson; Pétur Jónsson
- Date: 14 March 1828
- Location: Illugastaðir

Agnes Magnúsdóttir (27 October 1795 – 12 January 1830) was the last person to be executed in Iceland, along with Friðrik Sigurðsson. The pair were sentenced to death for the murder of Natan Ketilsson, a farmer in Illugastaðir in Vatnsnes, and Pétur Jónsson from Geitaskarð on 14 March 1828. They were executed by beheading in Vatnsdalshólar in Austur-Húnavatnssýsla on 12 January 1830.

== History ==
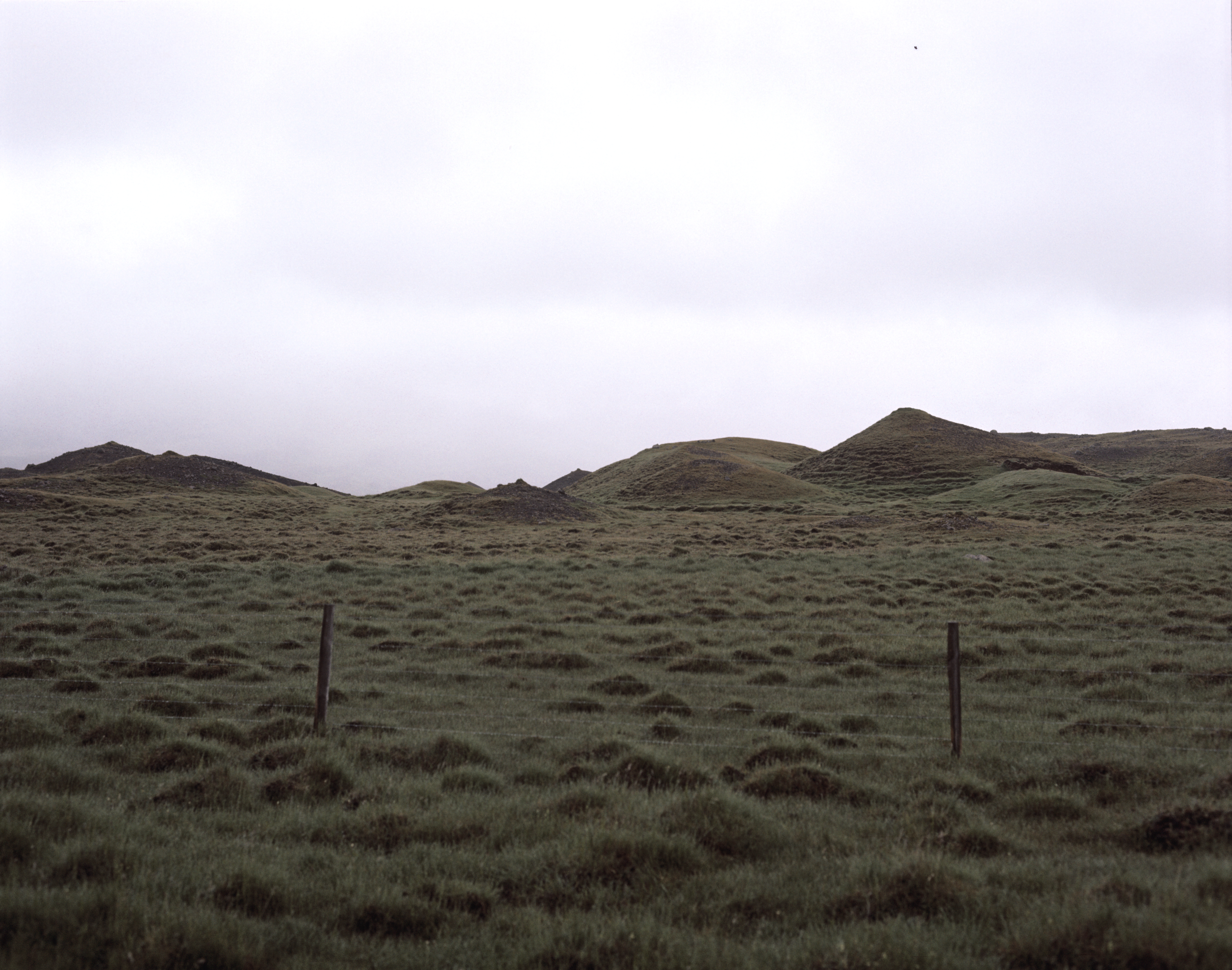
Trístapar are three adjoining small hills that are part of Vatnsdalshólar.

Agnes was in her thirties and working as a maid at Geitaskarð when she met Natan Ketilsson. She was hired at Illugastaðir for the next few days. Natan had additionally hired Sigríður Guðmundsdóttir as his housekeeper, who was 16 years old and romantically involved with Natan's neighbor, Friðrik Sigurðsson.

=== The murder ===
On the evening of March 13, 1828, Friðrik Sigurðsson came to Illugastaður and had the two maids, Agnes and Sigríður, hide in a barn until Natan and Pétur Jónsson, a visitor to the farm, were asleep. When the men were asleep, Agnes and Friðrik went into the baðstofa (the main living space of the house) where the two men were sleeping and Friðrik killed them both with a knife. It is not known whether Sigríður took part in the murder itself, but before Friðrik and Agnes set the baðstofa on fire, she stole what was considered valuable. Agnes went to the town of Stapakoti in Vatnsnes to report the fire. When the fire was put out and the bodies were found, authorities determined that Natan and Pétur's deaths had not been an accident.

=== Execution ===
The axe blade used to behead Agnes is on display at the National Museum of Iceland.

== In the arts and media ==
Agnes was the subject of the 1995 Icelandic film Agnes by Egill Eðvarðsson.

She is also the subject of the 2013 novel Burial Rites by Australian writer Hannah Kent. In 2017, it was announced that Jennifer Lawrence would play the role of Agnes in the film adaptation of Burial Rites, directed by Luca Guadagnino. As of May 2025 the film is still in development.

== Memorial ==
The site of the execution is now a memorial, the paths to it lined with plaques engraved with lines from Kent's novel Burial Rites.

== See also ==
- List of most recent executions by jurisdiction
