= Peter Fjeldsted Hoppe =

Danish civil servant

Peter Fjeldsted Hoppe (14 August 1794 – 23 May 1848) was a Danish civil servant who served as Governor of Iceland (1824–1829).

Hoppe was the son of Johann Christopher Hoppe, a naval officer and chamberlain, and his wife Johanne Magdalene Fjeldsted, daughter of Þorkell Fjeldsted, Governor of Norway. His brother was Torkil Abraham Hoppe, governor of Iceland from 1841 to 1847.
