= Lorentz Angel Krieger =

Danish civil servant and governor (1797–1838)

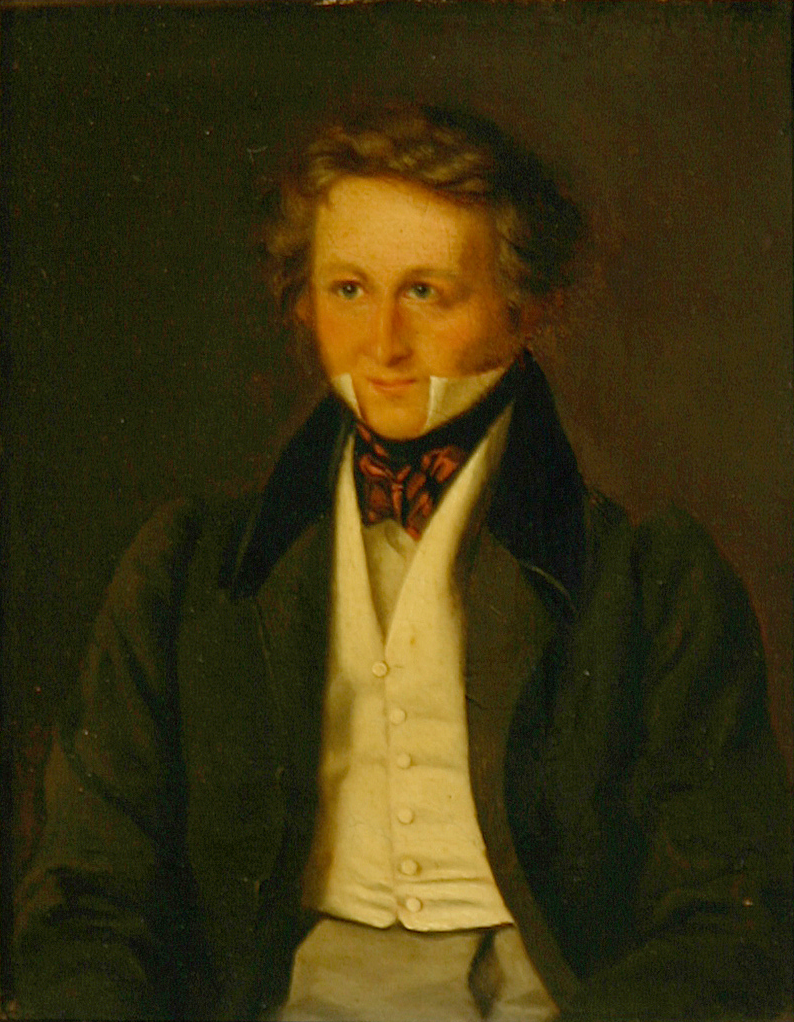
Lorentz Angel Krieger (1797-1838)

Lorentz Angel Krieger (10 May 1797 – 4 May 1838) was a Danish civil servant who served as Governor of Iceland (1829–1836).

Krieger was born in Copenhagen to his parents being a naval officer Johan Cornelius Krieger and his wife Anne Sophie Rawert. He graduated from his home school in 1814 and graduated in law in 1819.
