= 1768 in Iceland =

- Decades: 1750s; 1760s; 1770s; 1780s
- See also: Other events in 1768 · Timeline of Icelandic history

Events in the year 1768 in Iceland.

== Incumbents ==
- Monarch: Christian VII
- Governor of Iceland: Christian von Proeck

== Events ==
- 30 May: Eggert Ólafsson and his wife, Ingibjörg Halldórsdóttir drowned after their boat capsizes in Breiðafjörður.
- Christian von Proeck takes over as Governor of Iceland, taking over from Otto von Rantzau.
