= 1763 in Iceland =

- Decades: 1750s; 1760s; 1770s; 1780s
- See also: Other events in 1763 · Timeline of Icelandic history

Events in the year 1763 in Iceland.

== Incumbents ==
- Monarch: Frederick V
- Governor of Iceland: Otto von Rantzau

== Events ==
- 22 August: Ivar Jónsson and Ólöf Jónsdóttir were executed for incest and hidden childbirth. This was the last execution carried out for incest in Iceland.
- 20 November: Hólar Cathedral was consecrated, following completion earlier in the year,

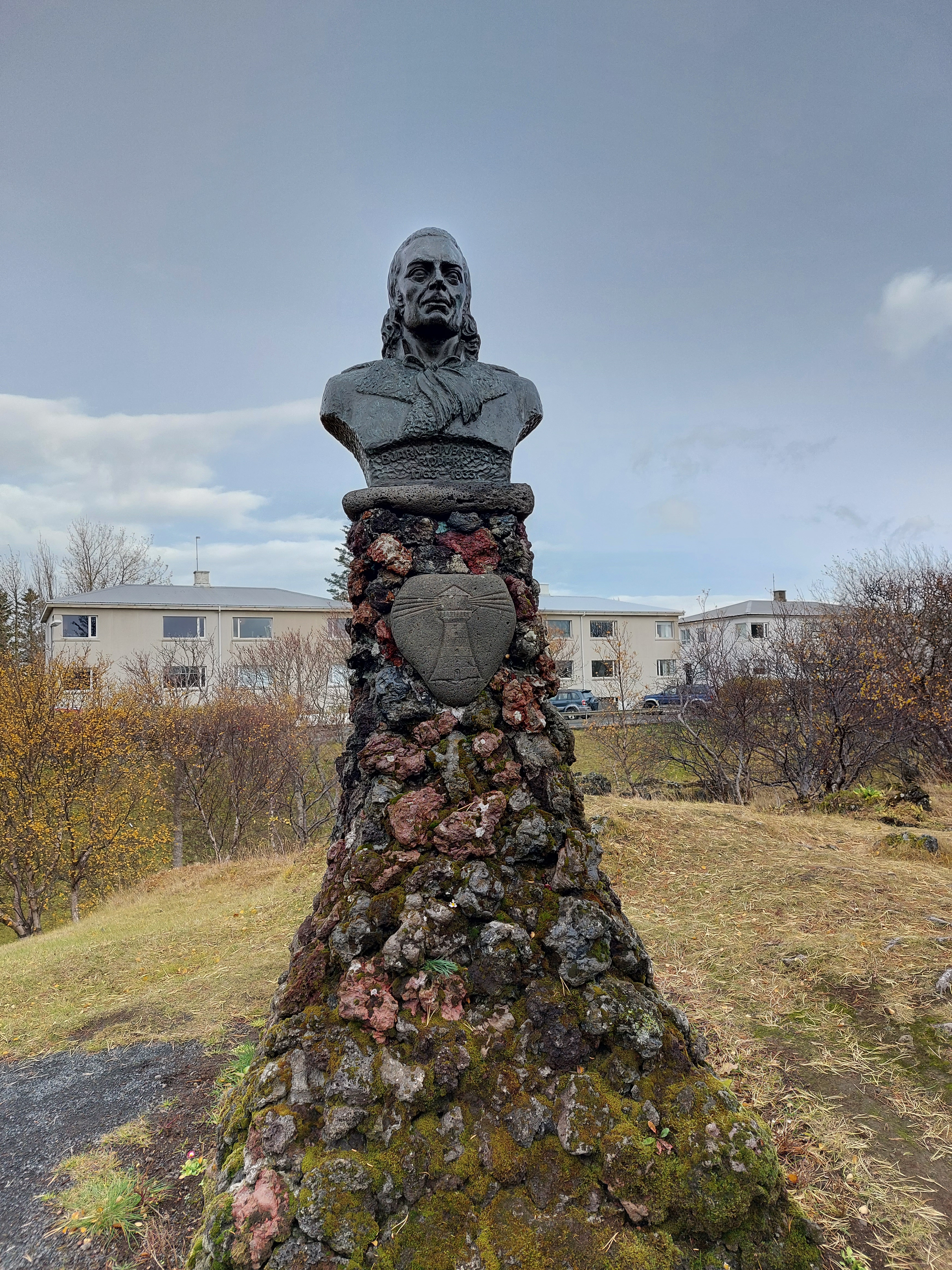
Memorial to Bjarni Sívertsen in Hellisgerði

== Births ==
- Bjarni Sívertsen: merchant
