= Wichmann Lastrop =

Wichmann Lastrop (8 April 1696 in Hamburg – 9 December 1747 in Hamburg) was a Hamburg merchant and grand burgher, and one of the largest business magnates in Hamburg in the early 18th century.

In 1722, he married Ilsabe Tönnies (1702–1739), daughter of the merchant and banker Johann Friedrich Tönnies. Original music by Georg Philipp Telemann, Opus TWV 11/2 ("Vermischet euch, helebte saiten (Lastrop-Tönnies)"), was composed for their wedding.

On 9 October 1742 he married Magdalena Catharina Anderson (1713–1746), a daughter of the Hamburg Mayor (head of state of the city-republic) and noted scientist Johann Anderson.
