= 1758 in Iceland =

- Decades: 1750s; 1760s; 1770s
- See also: Other events in 1758 · Timeline of Icelandic history

Events in the year 1758 in Iceland.

== Incumbents ==
- Monarch: Frederick V
- Governor of Iceland: Otto von Rantzau

== Events ==
- The Natural History of Iceland is reprinted in English.
- Copenhagen based trading company Hörmangarafélagið ceases operations after handling trade to Iceland since 1743.
