= 1757 in Iceland =

- Decades: 1750s; 1760s; 1770s
- See also: Other events in 1757 · Timeline of Icelandic history

Events in the year 1757 in Iceland.

== Incumbents ==
- Monarch: Frederick V
- Governor of Iceland: Otto von Rantzau

== Events ==
- The oldest house in Nedstakaupstaður in Ísafjörður was built.
- Bjarni Pálsson and Eggert Ólafsson complete a research trip around Iceland.
