= 1761 in Iceland =

- Decades: 1750s; 1760s; 1770s; 1780s
- See also: Other events in 1761 · Timeline of Icelandic history

Events in the year 1761 in Iceland.

== Incumbents ==
- Monarch: Frederick V
- Governor of Iceland: Otto von Rantzau

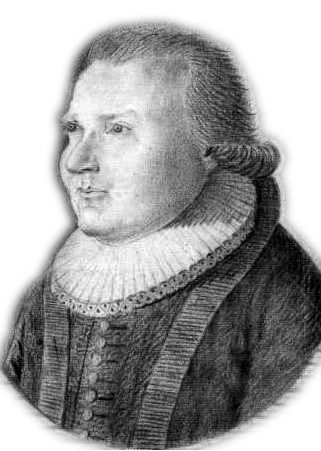
Geir Vídalín

== Events ==
- Hvalbakur began appearing on maps in 1761
- Construction begins on Stjórnarráðshúsið.

== Births ==
- 27 October: Geir Vídalín, prelate
- Bjarni Bjarnason, murderer
