= 1767 in Iceland =

- Decades: 1740s; 1750s; 1760s; 1770s; 1780s
- See also: Other events in 1767 · Timeline of Icelandic history

Events in the year 1767 in Iceland.

== Incumbents ==
- Monarch: Christian VII
- Governor of Iceland: Otto von Rantzau

== Events ==
- Nesstofa is built in Seltjarnarnes.

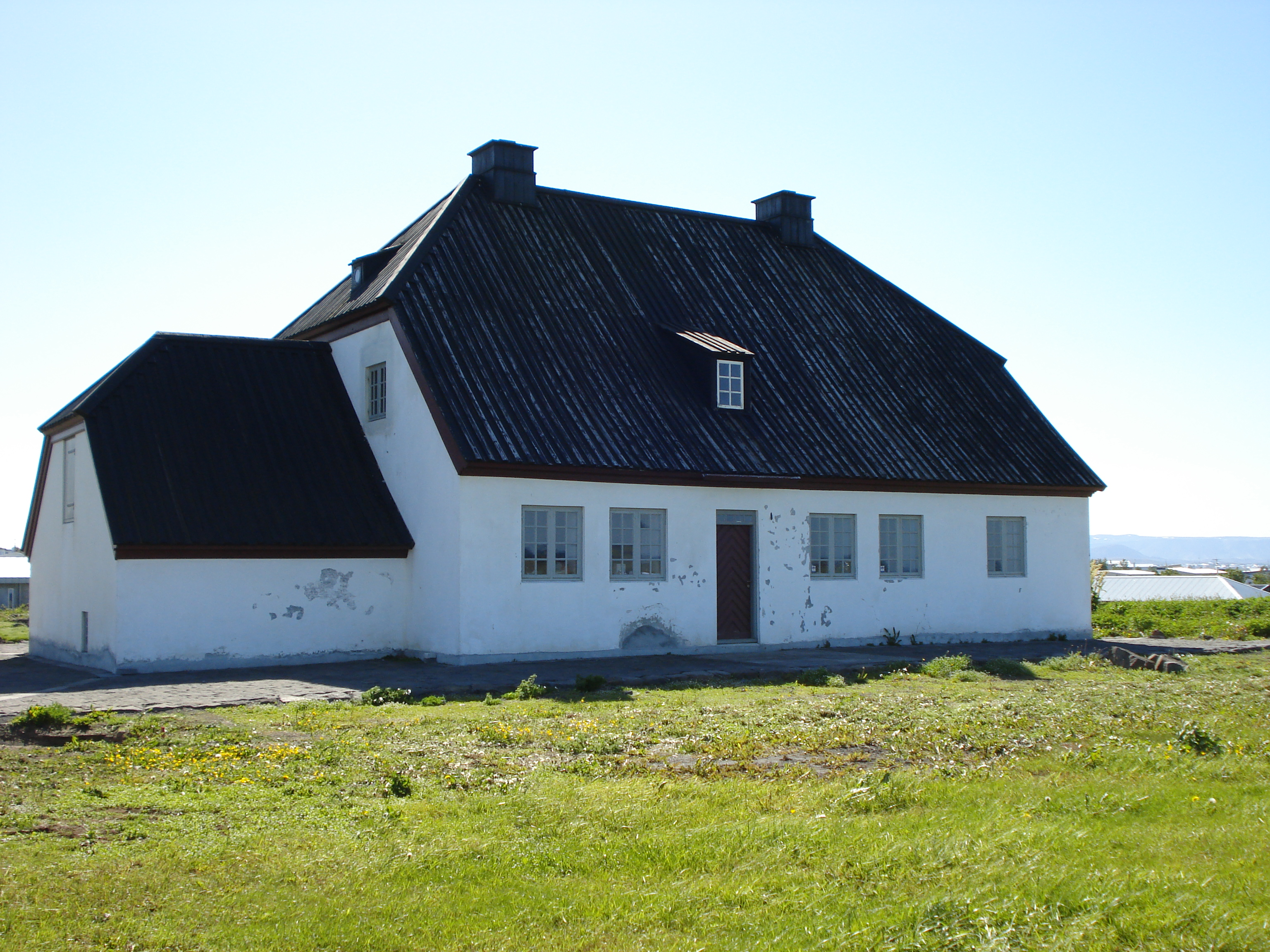
Nesstofa, built in 1767

== Births ==
- Steinunn Sveinsdóttir, murderer.
