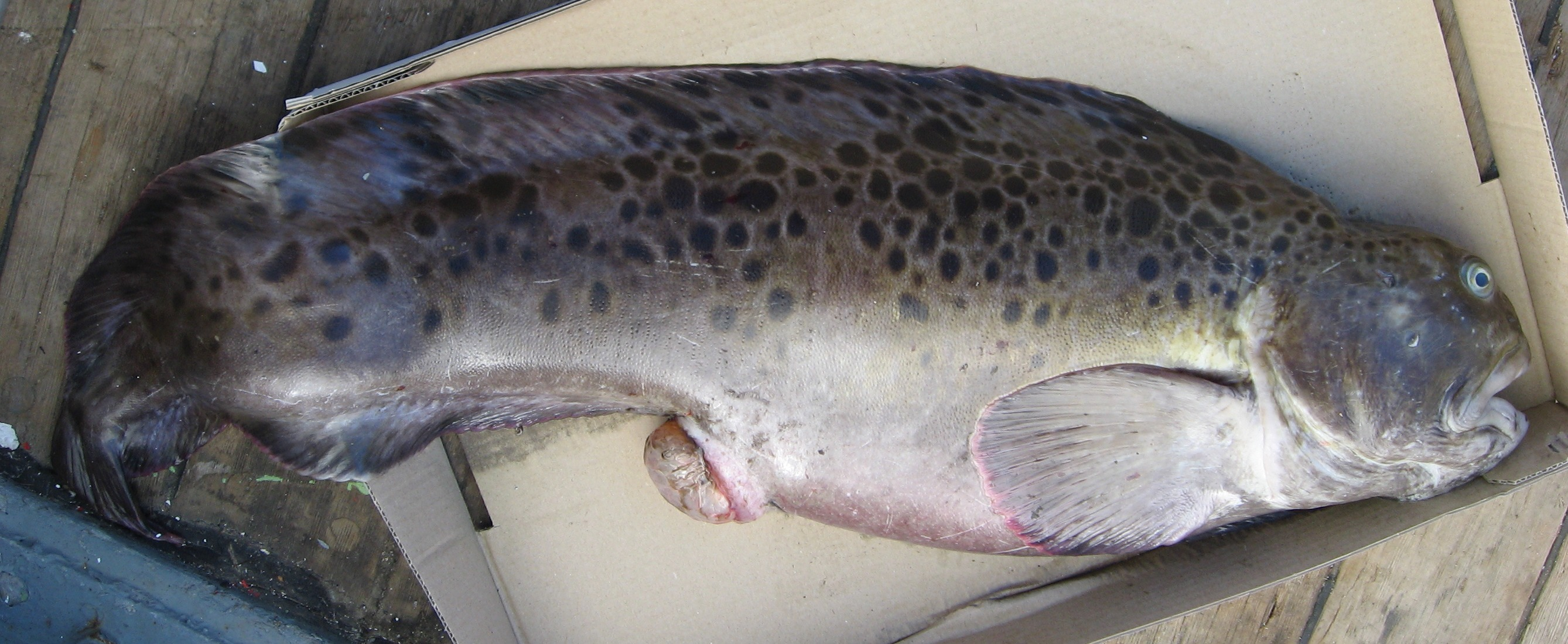
- Recently caught individual from Upernavik Kujalleq, Greenland

Conservation status
- Near Threatened (IUCN 3.1) (Europe)

- Unranked (NatureServe)

Scientific classification
- Kingdom: Animalia
- Phylum: Chordata
- Class: Actinopterygii
- Order: Perciformes
- Family: Anarhichadidae
- Genus: Anarhichas
- Species: A. minor

Binomial name
- Anarhichas minor (Ólafsson, 1772)

Synonyms
- Anarhichas karrak (Bonnaterre, 1788); Anarhichas maculatus (Bloch & Schneider, 1801); Anarhichas scansor (Bloch & Schneider, 1801); Anarhichas leopardus (Agassiz, 1831)

= Anarhichas minor =

Species of fish

Anarhichas minor, the spotted wolffish, spotted sea cat or leopardfish, is a large marine fish of the family Anarhichadidae. This bottom-dwelling species is found across the North Atlantic and adjacent parts of the Arctic Ocean from north of Russia and the Scandinavian Peninsula to the Scotian Shelf, off Nova Scotia, Canada. In Canada the population declined by about 90% from the late 1970s through the early 1990s, particularly in the northern part of its range. In Canada it is classified as a threatened species.

== Taxonomy ==
Anarhichas minor was first formally described in 1772 by the Icelandic explorer, writer and conservator of the Icelandic language Eggert Ólafsson with the type locality given as Iceland. It is one of four species of wolffishes in the genus Anarhichas. The specific name minor should mean "smaller" or "lesser", however Olafsson meant it to be "latter" as this was the second wolffish species to be described.

== General description ==
They have prominent canine-like teeth in the front of both jaws; a heavy head with a blunt, rounded snout; small eyes; a long, stout body with no pelvic fins; a long dorsal fin extending to the base of caudal; flexible spiny rays; a small, slightly rounded caudal fin; rounded pectoral fins; firm musculature; colours variable from pale olive to deep brown with upper parts sprinkled with irregularly shaped blackish-brown spots; maximum length to over 1.8 m (5.9 ft) and weight to 23 kg (51 lb).

=== Similar species ===
The spotted wolffish can be distinguished from the northern (A. denticulatus) and Atlantic wolffish (A. lupus) by its dark spots.

== Distribution ==
Spotted wolffish occur in the Arctic Ocean and on both sides of the North Atlantic Ocean from Labrador to the Barents Sea. Its northern limit in Canada is Baffin Bay, although its presence is rare. In the western North Atlantic, it is found off east and west Greenland, on the Labrador Shelf and Grand Banks and less commonly on the Scotian Shelf.

This species has been caught as far south as Scotland and Ireland.

== Habitat and life history ==
This species is found offshore in cold, deep water, usually below 5 °C (41 °F) and between 50–800 m (160–2,620 ft) in depth but as shallow as 25 m (82 ft) in Canadian Arctic populations. They prefer a coarse sand and sand/shell hash bottom with rocky areas nearby for shelter and nest-building. Spawning occurs in summer to late fall/early winter. As many as 54,600 large eggs [up to 6 mm (0.24 in) in diameter] are laid in deep water in clusters on the sea floor, and are guarded primarily by males. Growth rate is slower for this species than for the Atlantic and northern wolffish (Barents Sea). Fish become mature at seven years of age or older and can live to 21 years. The species does not form large schools and migrations are local and limited.

== Diet ==
Spotted wolffish primarily feed upon hard-shelled invertebrates found on the bottom, such as crustaceans, mollusks and echinoderms. Their diet also consists of other fish species and will consume eggs and larvae from fish which lay their eggs in a nest. Incidents of cannibalism have also been documented.

== Conservation status ==
This species has been identified as threatened by the Committee on the Status of Endangered Wildlife in Canada (COSEWIC). It is listed under the Canadian federal Species at Risk Act and was afforded protection under it as of June 2004. The IUCN assess it as Near Threatened in Europe.

=== Threats ===
Overfishing and habitat alteration are believed to have played a role in the observed declines in wolffish abundance. In Canadian waters, this species is not targeted by the fishing industry, but bycatch mortality by offshore trawlers and long-liners is considered a threat. In addition, activities that disturb the ocean bottom, such as trawling, may damage spawning habitat.
