= 1760 in Iceland =

- Decades: 1750s; 1760s; 1770s; 1780s
- See also: Other events in 1760 · Timeline of Icelandic history

Events in the year 1760 in Iceland.

== Incumbents ==
- Monarch: Frederick V
- Governor of Iceland: Otto von Rantzau

== Events ==
- 18 March: The Directorate of Health is established. Jón Sveinsson is appointed the Director of Health.
- The first Icelandic children's book was published, Barna-Liood : med Ljuflings-Lag by Reverend Vigfús Jónsson in Hítardalur.
