= 1755 in Iceland =

- Decades: 1750s; 1760s; 1770s
- See also: Other events in 1755 · Timeline of Icelandic history

Events in the year 1755 in Iceland.

== Incumbents ==
- Monarch: Frederick V
- Governor of Iceland: Otto von Rantzau

== Events ==
- September 11: A major earthquake strikes Skjálfandi in Northern Iceland, causing damage in the area.
- October 17: Katla erupts.
