= Johann Anderson =

Johann Anderson may refer to:

- Johann Anderson (1674–1743), German naturalist
- Johann Anderson (politician) (1905–?), Estonian politician

== See also ==
- Johan Anderson
