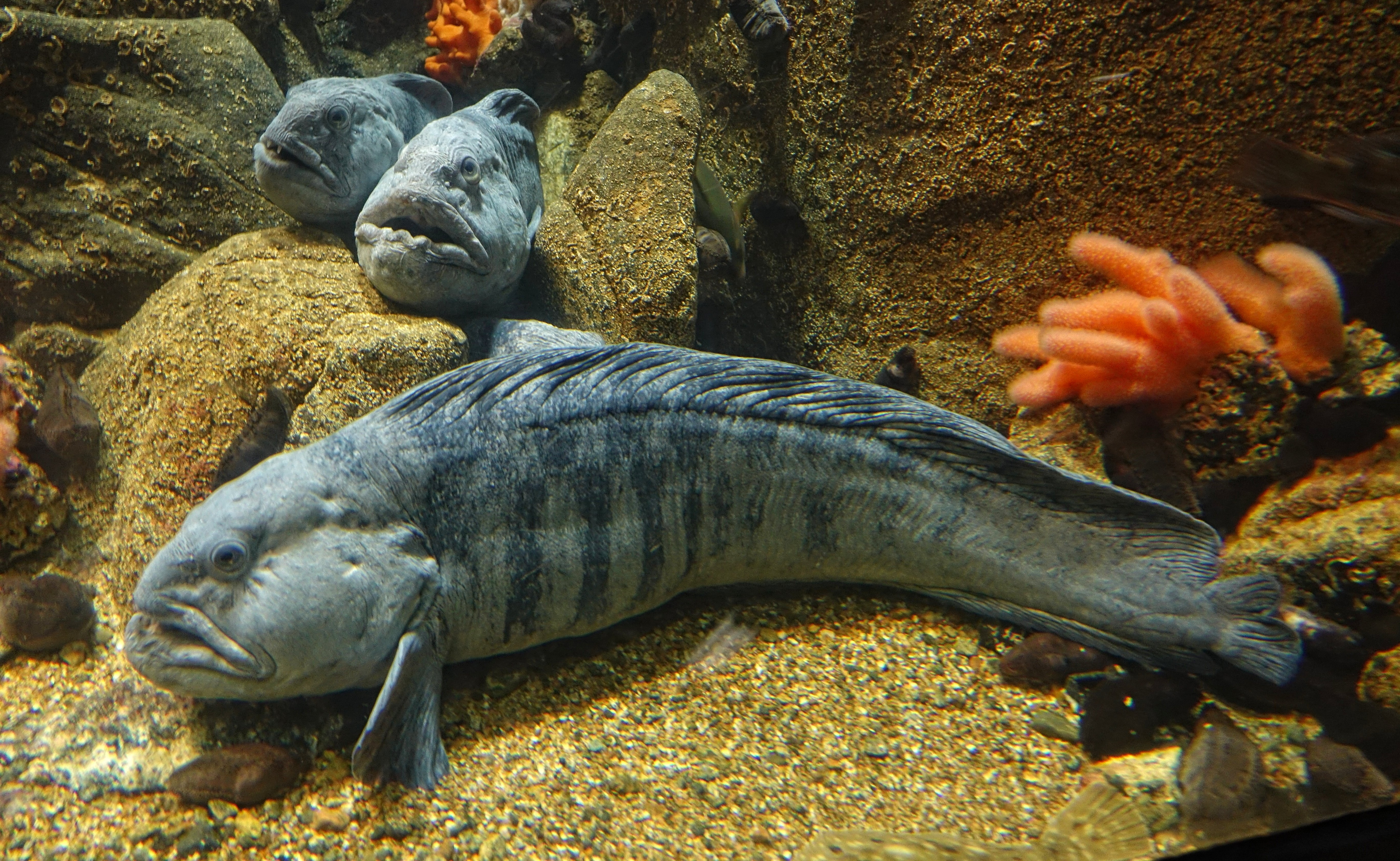

Conservation status
- Data Deficient (IUCN 3.1) (Europe)

Scientific classification
- Kingdom: Animalia
- Phylum: Chordata
- Class: Actinopterygii
- Division: Teleostei
- Order: Perciformes
- Family: Anarhichadidae
- Genus: Anarhichas
- Species: A. lupus

Binomial name
- Anarhichas lupus Linnaeus, 1758
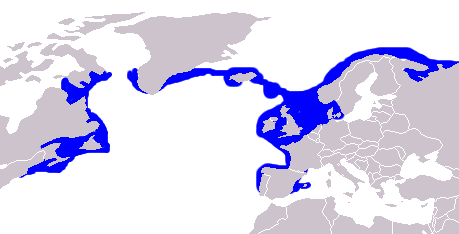
- Distribution in blue

Synonyms
- Anarhichas strigosus Gmelin, 1789; Anarhichas vomerinus Agassiz, 1867; Anarhichas lupus marisalbi Barsukov 1956

= Atlantic wolffish =

Species of fish

The Atlantic wolffish (Anarhichas lupus), also known as the seawolf, Atlantic catfish, ocean catfish, devil fish, wolf eel (the common name for its Pacific relative), woof or sea cat, is a marine fish of the wolffish family Anarhichadidae, native to the North Atlantic Ocean. The numbers of the Atlantic wolffish in US waters are rapidly being depleted, most likely due to overfishing and bycatch, and it is currently a Species of Concern according to the U.S. National Oceanic and Atmospheric Administration's National Marine Fisheries Service.

Apart from their unique appearance, wolffish are distinguished by the natural antifreeze they produce to keep their blood moving fluidly in their very cold habitat, involvement by both the male and female in brood bearing and the large size of their eggs. They are also an important factor in controlling green crab and sea urchin populations, which can become overly disruptive to habitats if left unchecked. Wolffish population success is also an important indicator of the health of other bottom-dweller populations, such as Atlantic cod.

== Taxonomy ==
The Atlantic wolffish was first formally described in 1758 in the 10th edition of the Systema Naturae by Carl Linnaeus with its type locality given as the "northern English Ocean". When Linnaeus described it he classified it within the monotypic genus Anarhichas so today A. lupus is the type species of that genus. The specific name lupus means "wolf", one of the common names for these fishes is "sea wolf", the name being given because of the canine-like front teeth.

== Characteristics ==
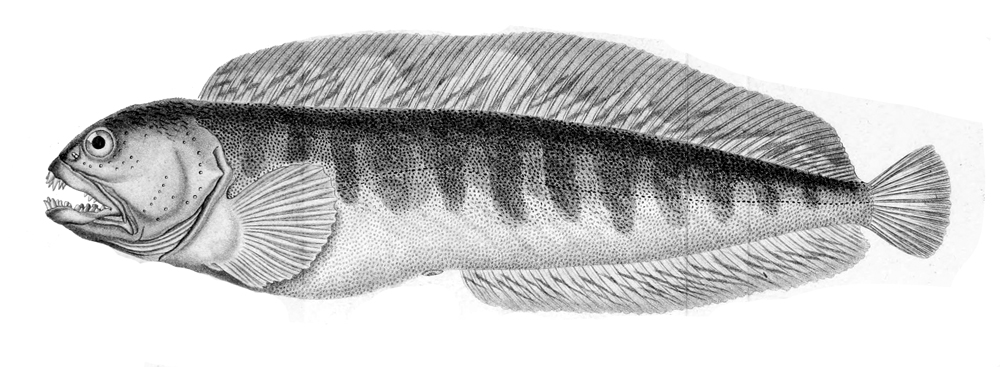
Atlantic wolffish

The Atlantic wolffish has retained the bodily form and general external characteristics of small blennies (Blennioidei). The largest specimen recorded measured 1.5 m (5 ft) long and weighed almost 18 kg (40 lb). Its body is long, subcylindrical in front, compressed in the caudal portion, smooth and slippery, the rudimentary scales being embedded and almost hidden in the skin. Atlantic wolffish vary in color, usually seen as purplish-brown, a dull olive green, or blueish gray. An even dorsal fin extends the whole length of the back, and a similar fin from the vent to the caudal fin, as in blennies. The pectorals are large and rounded and the pelvic fins are entirely absent. Its obtuse, eel-like body type makes the fish swim slowly, undulating from side to side, like an eel.

The Atlantic wolffish's distinguishing feature, from which it gets its common name, is its extensive teeth structure. Its dentition distinguishes the Atlantic wolffish from all the other members of the family Anarhichadidae. Both the lower and upper jaws are armed with four to six fang-like, strong, conical teeth. Behind the conical teeth in the upper jaw, there are three rows of crushing teeth. The central row has four pairs of molars and the outer rows house blunted conical teeth. The lower jaw has two rows of molars behind the primary conical teeth. The wolffish's throat is also scattered with serrated teeth.

Atlantic wolffish inhabit both the west and east coasts of the Atlantic. In the west Atlantic, they are present as far north as the Davis Strait, of the Canadian territory of Nunavut, populating the shores of Greenland, Newfoundland, and Nova Scotia, extending as far south as Cape Cod. Although they are seldom seen south of Cape Cod, there have been sightings in New Jersey. The densest populations are in Georges Bank, the Gulf of Maine and the Great South Channel. In the eastern Atlantic, they range from Russia's White Sea and Novaya Zemlya, through the Nordic countries and British Isles, to the Bay of Biscay. A single record was reported in 1958 from the western Mediterranean Sea in the gulf of Genoa, Italy.

Atlantic wolffish are primarily stationary fish, rarely moving from their rocky homes. They are benthic dwellers, living on the hard ocean floor, frequently seen in nooks and small caves. They like cold water, at depths of 20 to 500 m (66–1,640 ft). They are usually found in water temperatures of −1 to 11 °C (30–52 °F). Since they can live in near-freezing waters (salt water only freezes at slightly below 0 °C or 32 °F), to keep their blood moving smoothly, they contain a natural antifreeze.

Three related species (Atlantic, northern and spotted wolffish) occur in the north Atlantic. The northern wolffish has loose gelatinous flesh, but the other species are esteemed as food, both fresh and preserved. They are marketed in Britain as "Scotch halibut" and "Scarborough woof", or, simply "woof" in other areas of the northeast coast, and are a popular ingredient in fish and chips.

In Iceland and Norway, the Atlantic wolfish is known as "steinbítur" or "steinbit", which translates to "stone biter" in English. This name is derived from the fish's strong jaws and teeth, which are capable of crushing hard-shelled prey such as shellfish and crustaceans.

== Diet ==
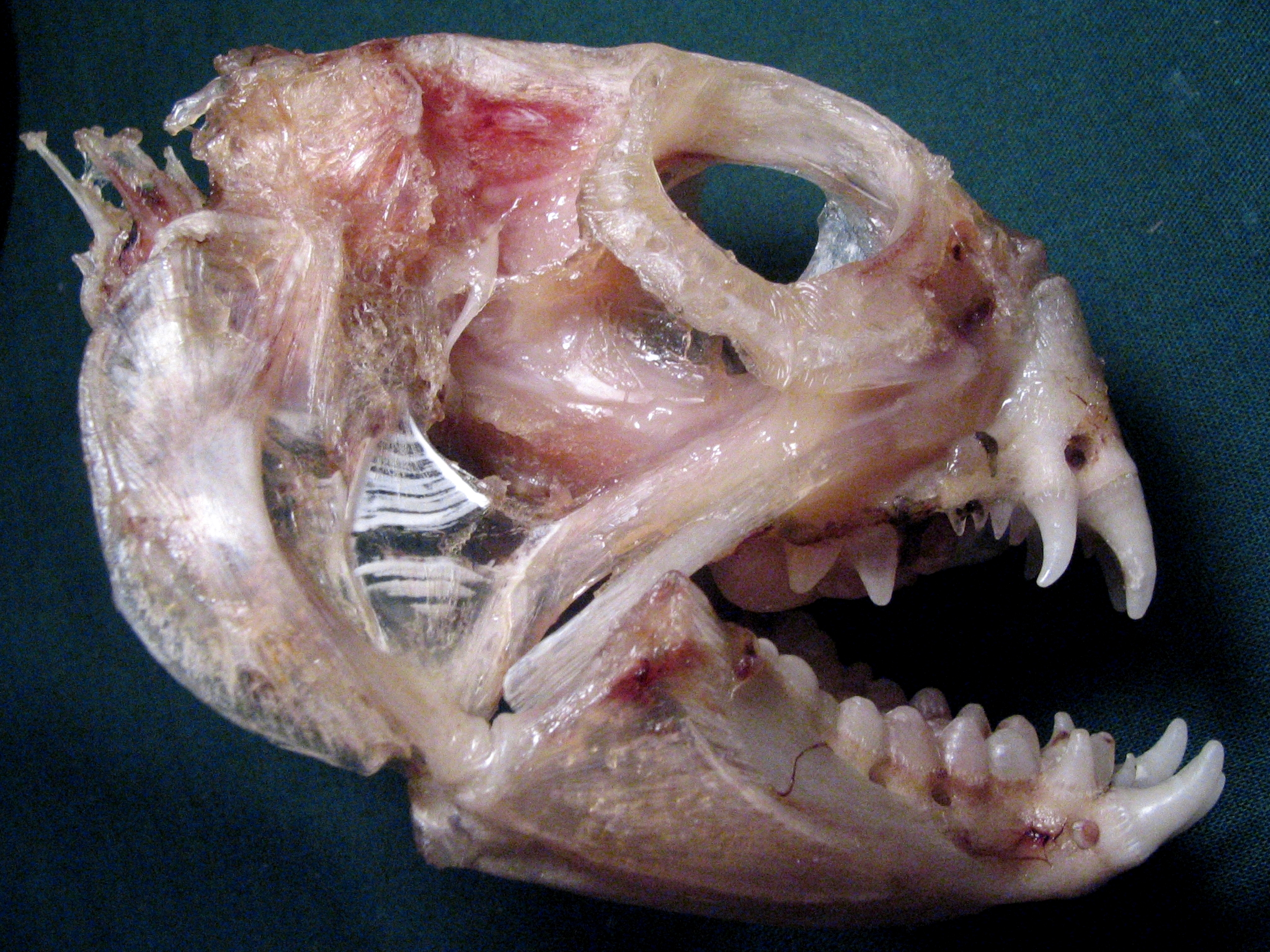
Skull

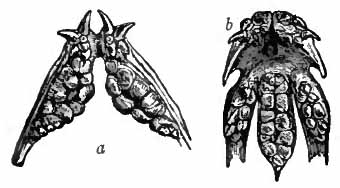
Drawing of the jaws of the seawolf from 1911 Encyclopædia Britannica

Atlantic wolffish use their strong jaws to eat hardshell molluscs, crustaceans, and echinoderms. They do not eat other fish. They are known to frequently eat large whelks (Buccinum), cockles (Polynices, Chrysodomus and Sipho), sea clams (Mactra), large hermit crabs, starfish, and sea urchins. They are an important predator of sea urchins and green crabs, whose populations escalate rapidly and can negatively affect the health of a marine system.

== Reproduction ==
The manner in which Atlantic wolffish fertilize their eggs distinguishes them from many fish. Instead of the female depositing her eggs in the open ocean for the male fish to fertilize and then continue on his way, they are internally fertilized and the male wolffish stays with the nest and protects the eggs for as long as four months, until the brood is strong enough to gain independence. Their eggs are 5.5–6.0 mm in diameter, (among the largest fish eggs known), yellow tinted and opaque. The eggs are laid on the ocean floor, often in shoal water, sticking together in loose clumps, surrounded by seaweeds and stones. Atlantic wolffish mature relatively late, at age six.

== Conservation status ==
According to data compiled by the National Marine Fisheries Service, since 1983, the landings from U.S. fishing vessels of Atlantic wolffish as bycatch has declined 95%, landing 64.7 t (63.7 long tons; 71.3 short tons) in 2007. In 1950, when the NMFS started collecting their data, 1,098 t (1,081 long tons; 1,210 short tons) of Atlantic wolffish were landed, worth $137,008. In 1970, 271.2 t (266.9 long tons; 298.9 short tons); the landings peaked in 1983 at 1,207 t (1,188 long tons; 1,330 short tons), bringing in $455,291; rapidly depleting again and by 1990 the landings were down to 400 t (390 long tons; 440 short tons), and by 2002, 154 t (152 long tons; 170 short tons). The last available data from the NMFS were in 2007 at 64.7 t (63.7 long tons; 71.3 short tons), worth a total of $100,341.

Currently, the Atlantic wolffish is categorized as a Species of Concern under the National Marine Fisheries Service. Species of Concern are those species about which the U.S. National Oceanic and Atmospheric Administration, National Marine Fisheries Service (NMFS) has some concerns regarding status and threats, but for which insufficient information is available to indicate a need to list the species under the U.S. Endangered Species Act (ESA).

On October 1, 2008, the Conservation Law Foundation (CLF), along with Dr. Erica Fuller and Dr. Les Watling, petitioned the US NMFS for the protection of the Atlantic wolffish under the ESA. The petition called for the protection of the Atlantic wolffish and wolffish habitat throughout the US northwest Atlantic waters. It recommended a designation of critical habitat be set up to close off both commercial and recreational fishing in those areas (which would overlap closed areas for various other fishing industries for the benefit of fishermen), the development of catch and release protocols, educational programs for fishermen in the Gulf of Maine area, and possession prohibitions. On January 1, 2009 the NMFS announced a positive 90-day finding that the petition was warranted, which triggered the initiation of a status review which will result in a decision on whether to list the species under the ESA. On November 6, 2009, the NMFS issued a finding that the proposed protections were not warranted.

In 2014, HELCOM classified the Atlantic wolffish population in the Baltic Sea as endangered on the IUCN Red List scale.

== Footnotes ==
- "Anarhichas lupus". Integrated Taxonomic Information System.
