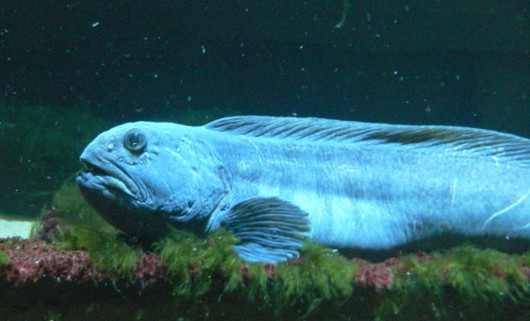
- Northern wolffish, Anarhichas denticulatus

Scientific classification
- Kingdom: Animalia
- Phylum: Chordata
- Class: Actinopterygii
- Division: Teleostei
- Order: Perciformes
- Suborder: Zoarcoidei
- Family: Anarhichadidae; Bonaparte, 1832

Genera
- See text

= Anarhichadidae =

Anarhichadidae Temporal range: Middle Miocene to present

Family of ray-finned fishes

Anarhichadidae, the wolffishes, sea wolves or wolf eels, is a family of marine ray-finned fishes belonging to the order Perciformes. These are predatory, eel-shaped fishes native to the cold waters of the Arctic, North Pacific, and North Atlantic Oceans.

== Taxonomy ==
Anarhichadidae was first proposed as a family in 1832 by the French zoologist Charles Lucien Bonaparte. The fifth edition of Fishes of the World classifies this family within the suborder Zoarcoidei in the order Scorpaeniformes. Other authorities classify this family in the infraorder Zoarcales within the suborder Cottoidei of the Perciformes because removing the Scorpaeniformes from the Perciformes renders that taxon non-monophyletic.

== Etymology ==
Anarhichadidae is derived from the name of its type genus Anarhichas, which is an Ancient Greek name for the Atlantic wolffish (A. lupus) and means "the climber", in turn derived from the Greek anarrhichesis, which means "to climb or scramble up". This may be an allusion to the ancient belief that wolffishes left the water and climbed up on the rocks.

== Genera and species ==
Anarhichadidae contains two genera and five species:

Image	Genus	Living species
	Anarhichas Linnaeus, 1758	Northern wolffish, Anarhichas denticulatus Krøyer, 1845.; Atlantic wolffish or sea wolf, Anarhichas lupus Linnaeus, 1758.; Spotted wolffish, Anarhichas minor Olafsen, 1772.; Bering wolffish, Anarhichas orientalis Pallas, 1814.
	Anarrhichthys Ayres, 1855	Wolf eel, Anarrhichthys ocellatus Ayres, 1855.

An indeterminate fossil anarhichadid is known from the Middle Miocene–aged Kurasi Formation of Sakhalin, Russia.

== Characteristics ==
Anarhichadidae wolfishes have a largely compressed and, in the genus Anarhichas, a moderately elongate body. Anarrhichthys has an extremely elongate body, and this has given rise to its common name of wolf-eel. The long dorsal fin starts at the head and has many flexible spines and soft rays. The anal fin may have a single spine in Anarrhichthys, and again there is a large number of soft rays. The caudal fin is separate from the other median fins in Anarhichas but they are all three joined in Anarrhichthys. There is a single pair of nostrils. The scales, if present, are cycloid, tiny and do not overlap. There are well developed movement sensitive sensory canals on the head and as the fish ages the pores grow very large. There are 1 or 2 lateral lines made up of superficial neuromasts. There are robust conical teeth in the front of the jaws and large molar like teeth to the rear of those. The gill membranes are joined to the isthmus and the gill openings are set widely apart. There is no swim bladder. The counts of vertebrae are 72–89 in Anarhichas and 221–251 in Anarrhichthys. The longest published total length is for Anarrhichthys ocellatus and is 240 cm (94 in).

== Distribution and habitat ==
Anarhichadidae wolfishes prefer cooler waters and are found in the northern parts of the North Pacific and North Atlantic Oceans as well as in the Arctic Ocean. They are demersal fishes occurring in shallow to moderately deep and cold seas.

== Biology ==
Anarhichadidae wolffishes use their large teeth to feed on a diet of shelled invertebrates such as crabs, starfishes and sea urchins, as well as other prey, The peak mating season for wolffish is September to October. The male wolffish will guard the eggs 3–9 months until they hatch.

== Fisheries ==
Anarhichadidae wolffishes, in particular two Atlantic species, the spotted wolffish and the Atlantic wolffish, are targeted by commercial fisheries. The flesh is used for food and the skin to make leather.

== Trivia ==
The collegiate sports teams of the University of Alaska Anchorage have adopted the Seawolf, based on Tlingit and Haida legends, as their mascot.
