= 1753 in Iceland =

- Decades: 1750s; 1760s; 1770s
- See also: Other events in 1753 · Timeline of Icelandic history

The following events occurred in Iceland in the year 1753.

== Incumbents ==
- Monarch: Frederick V
- Governor of Iceland: Otto von Rantzau

== Events ==
- Skúli Magnússon sought a grant from the Danish king to build a better house, "which could receive young and healthy wanderers and beggars who wander around the country in groups". That building later became the Government House.
- Grímsvötn erupts.
