= 1754 in Iceland =

- Decades: 1750s; 1760s; 1770s
- See also: Other events in 1754 · Timeline of Icelandic history

Events in the year 1754 in Iceland.

== Incumbents ==
- Monarch: Frederick V
- Governor of Iceland: Otto von Rantzau

== Events ==
- March 19:The counties of Gullbringu and Kjósarsýsla are formed by the merger of two counties.

== Births ==
- August 24: Stefán Þórarinsson, magistrate and politician.
