= 1765 in Iceland =

- Decades: 1750s; 1760s; 1770s; 1780s
- See also: Other events in 1765 · Timeline of Icelandic history

Events in the year 1765 in Iceland.

== Incumbents ==
- Monarch: Frederick V
- Governor of Iceland: Otto von Rantzau

== Events ==
- The Icelandic Manuscript, SÁM 66 was written.

== Births ==
- 21 May: Ísleifur Einarsson, magistrate
