= 1766 in Iceland =

- Decades: 1750s; 1760s; 1770s; 1780s
- See also: Other events in 1766 · Timeline of Icelandic history

Events in the year 1766 in Iceland.

== Incumbents ==
- Monarch: Frederick V (until 14 January); Christian VII onwards
- Governor of Iceland: Otto von Rantzau

== Events ==
- Hekla erupted, producing the second largest lava flow, 1.3 km^{3} (0.31 cu mi) covering 65 km^{2} (25 sq mi), and third largest tephra volume, 0.24 km^{3} (0.058 cu mi), of any Icelandic volcano during the inhabited era.
- Holger Jacobaeus, a Danish merchant, constructed a large wooden house in Keflavík.
