= 1759 in Iceland =

- Decades: 1750s; 1760s; 1770s
- See also: Other events in 1759 · Timeline of Icelandic history

Events in the year 1759 in Iceland.

== Incumbents ==
- Monarch: Frederick V
- Governor of Iceland: Otto von Rantzau

== Events ==
- 20 March: King Frederick V issued a decree that a prison should be built in Iceland.
- 6 August: Björn Halldórsson, a priest based in Sauðlauksdalur receives seed potatoes from Copenhagen. This is believed to be the first potato crop in Iceland.
- September: Bjarni Pálsson becomes the first Icelander to complete a medical degree.
