= 1762 in Iceland =

- Decades: 1750s; 1760s; 1770s; 1780s
- See also: Other events in 1762 · Timeline of Icelandic history

Events in the year 1762 in Iceland.

== Incumbents ==
- Monarch: Frederick V
- Governor of Iceland: Otto von Rantzau

== Events ==
- A census was conducted in Iceland, however it is considered to be imperfect, and only the heads of household are recorded.

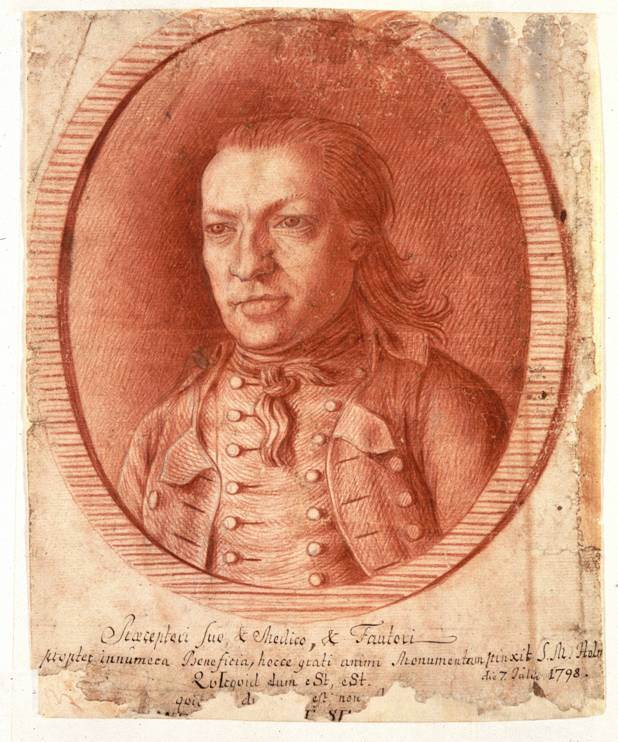
Sveinn Pálsson

== Births ==
- 25 April: Sveinn Pálsson, naturalist
- Benedikt Gröndal the elder, judge
- Ólafur Thorlacius, merchant
