= 1752 in Iceland =

- Decades: 1750s; 1760s; 1770s
- See also: Other events in 1752 · Timeline of Icelandic history

Events in the year 1752 in Iceland.

== Incumbents ==
- Monarch: Frederick V
- Governor of Iceland: Otto von Rantzau

== Events ==
- An earthquake occurs in Southern Iceland.

== Births ==
- 8 October: Grímur Jónsson Thorkelin, historian and secret archivist.
