= 1764 in Iceland =

- Decades: 1750s; 1760s; 1770s; 1780s
- See also: Other events in 1764 · Timeline of Icelandic history

Events in the year 1764 in Iceland.

== Incumbents ==
- Monarch: Frederick V
- Governor of Iceland: Otto von Rantzau

== Events ==
- Almenna Handelsfélagið took over the trade monopoly in Iceland.
