= Bjarni Bjarnason =

Bjarni Bjarnason may refer to:

- Bjarni Bjarnason (author)
- Bjarni Bjarnason (murderer)
