= 1756 in Iceland =

- Decades: 1750s; 1760s; 1770s
- See also: Other events in 1756 · Timeline of Icelandic history

Events in the year 1756 in Iceland.

== Incumbents ==
- Monarch: Frederick V
- Governor of Iceland: Otto von Rantzau

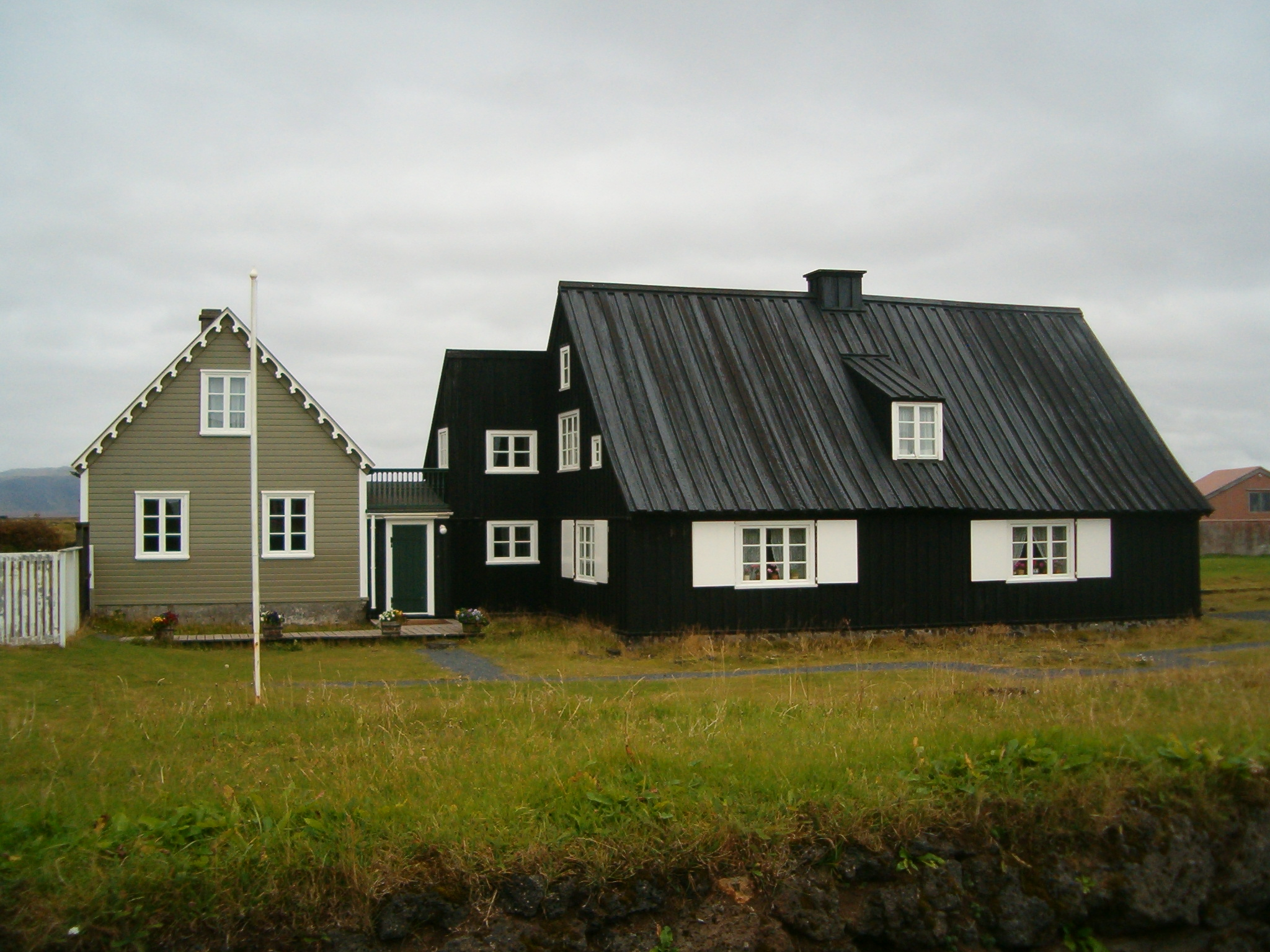
The house in Eyrarbakki, constructed in 1756.

== Events ==
- Two books of Icelandic sagas were published at Hólar, Ágætar fornmannasögur and Nokkrir margfróðir söguþættir.
- A syphilis outbreak is reported in Iceland.
- A house is constructed in Eyrarbakki
