= Johann Friedrich Tönnies =

German merchant and banker (1662–1736)

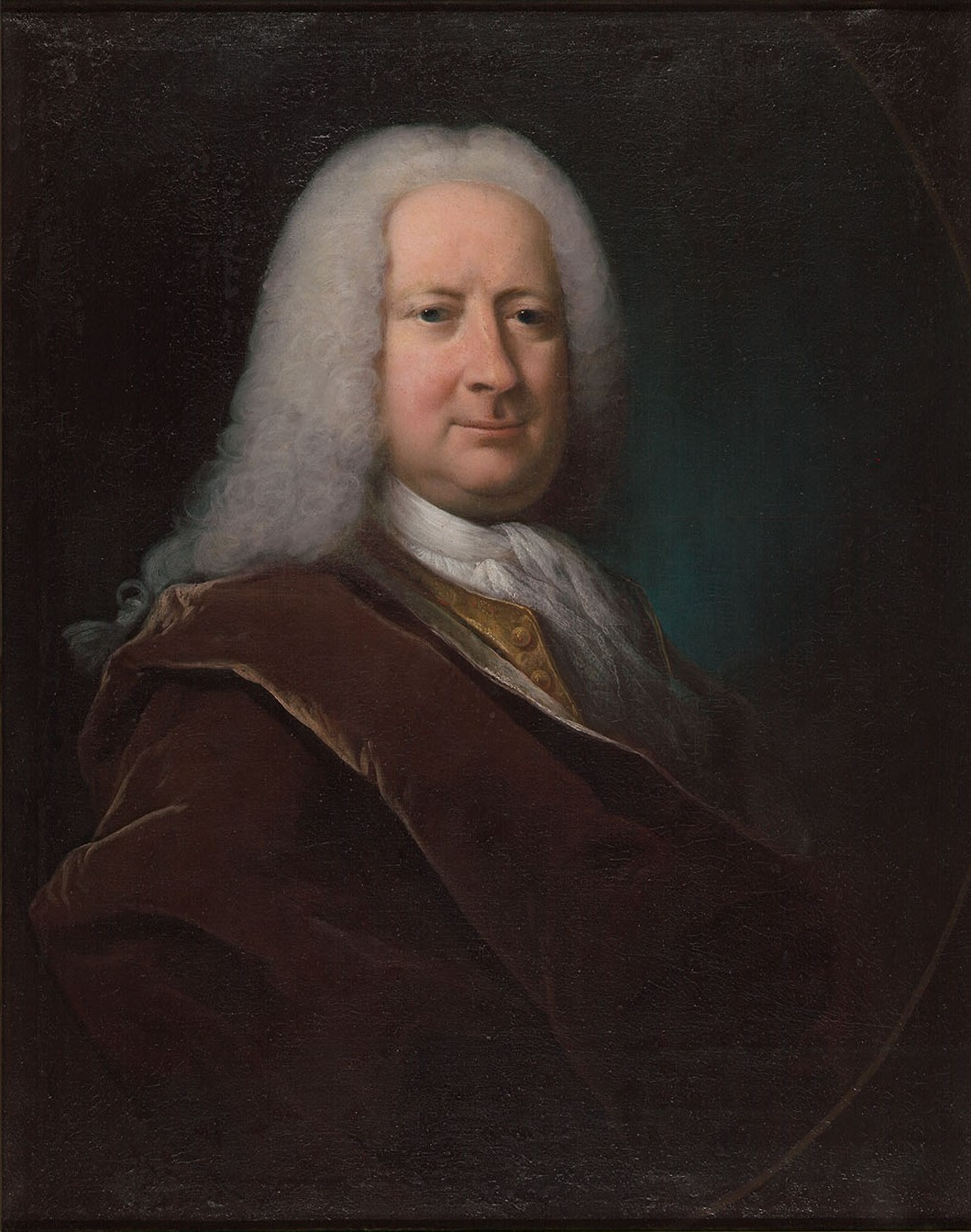
Johann Friedrich Tönnies, painted by Anton Paulsen ca. 1720

Johann Friedrich Tönnies (16 July 1662 in Stralsund – 12 April 1736 in Hamburg) was a Hamburg merchant and banker. His firm, Tönnies & Behrmann, was a leading Hamburg bank in the early 18th century. The firm had been founded by his father-in-law (in his first marriage) Johann Behrmann (1635–1698), also a native of Stralsund who had moved to Hamburg, and was originally mainly active in exporting cloth to London. After Behrmann's death, the firm was continued by Tönnies. Tönnies held the grand burghership of Hamburg.

A portrait of him by the Swedish painter Anton Paulsen from around 1720 survives. After the death of his first wife, he married Anna Wolpmann in 1696.
