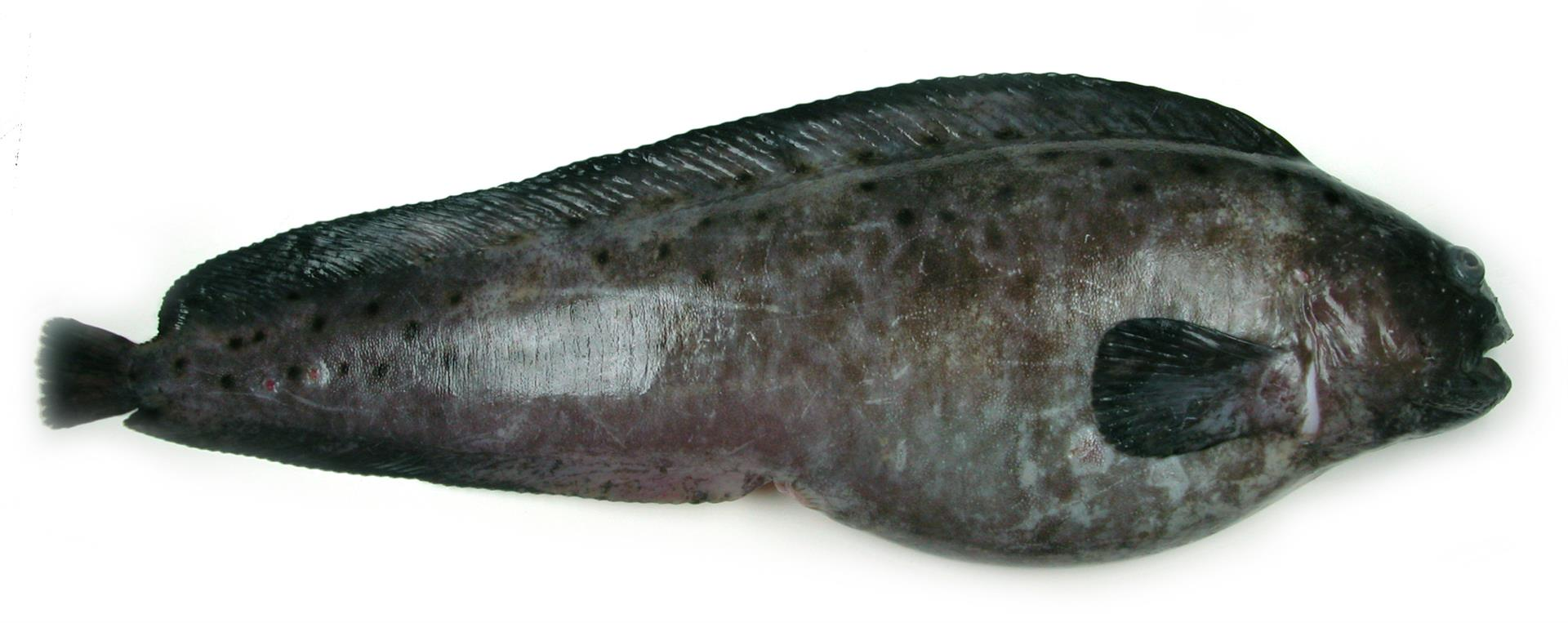

Conservation status
- Endangered (IUCN 3.1) (Europe)

- Unranked (NatureServe)

Scientific classification
- Kingdom: Animalia
- Phylum: Chordata
- Class: Actinopterygii
- Order: Perciformes
- Family: Anarhichadidae
- Genus: Anarhichas
- Species: A. denticulatus

Binomial name
- Anarhichas denticulatus Krøyer, 1845

Synonyms
- Lycichthys denticulatus (Krøyer, 1845); Anarhichas latifrons Steenstrup & Hallgrimsson, 1876; Lycichthys paucidens Gill, 1905; Lycichthys fortidens Gill, 1911; Lycichthys parvodens Lühmann, 1954

= Northern wolffish =

Species of fish

The northern wolffish (Anarhichas denticulatus), also known as the blue sea cat or jelly cat, is a species of marine ray-finned fish belonging to the family Anarhichadidae, the wolf fishes. This species is found in the North Atlantic Ocean and Arctic Ocean.

== Taxonomy ==
The Northern wolffish was first formally described in 1845 by the Danish zoologist Henrik Nikolai Krøyer with the type locality given as Greenland. The specific name means "denticulated" or "having fine teeth" alluding to the sharper, more finely pointed teeth of this species in comparison to the Atlantic wolffish (A. lupus).

== Description ==
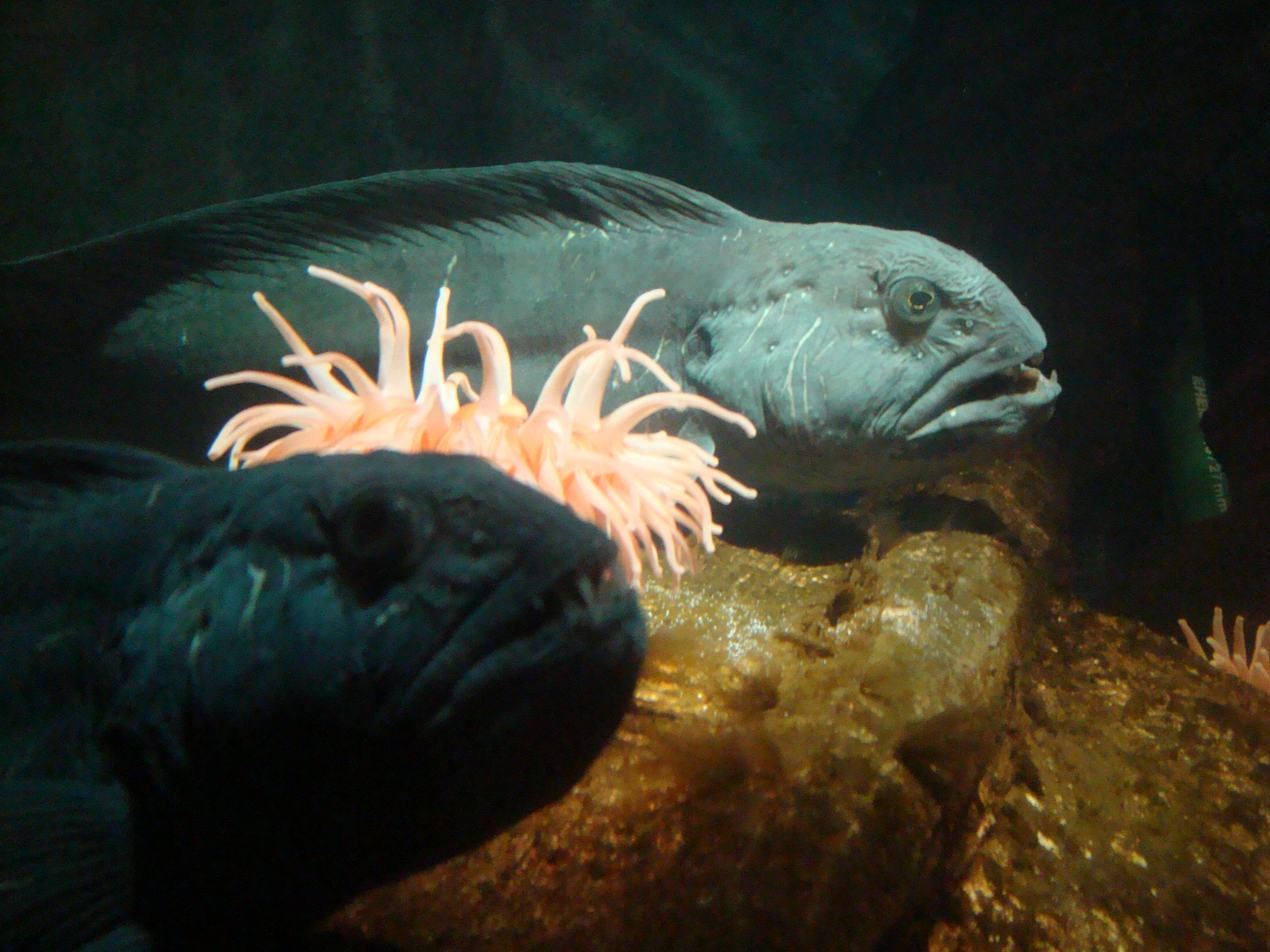
Captive northern wolffish at Chessington Sealife Centre

The northern wolffish is a robust, elongate fish with a large head, sharp snout and small eyes. The teeth are distinctive and prominent with large canine-like teeth to the front of the jaws and molar-like teeth at the back of the jaws. It does not have any pelvic fins. The overall colour of the body is greyish to dark brown with a pale purplish sheen and there are frequently marked with many but vague dark bars or spotting. The tissue of the muscles is soft and resembles jelly. The vomerine teeth are large, and may be rounded or pointed and extend back to the line of palatine teeth. The caudal fin is truncate and contains between 18 and 22 fin rays. The maximum published total length is 180 cm (71 in) and the maximum published weight is 20 kg (44 lb).

== Distribution and habitat ==
The Northern wolffish is found in the North Atlantic and Arctic oceans where it is distributed in the Barents and Norwegian seas to Spitsbergen, Iceland, Faroe Islands, southern Greenland and south along east coast of North America almost to Cape Cod and west to Prince Patrick Island in the Northwest Territories of Canada. They have been reported from the northern North Sea and the Bay of Biscay.

This species inhabits the open areas of the North Atlantic and the offshore region of the continental shelf occurring in bathypelagic waters and has been recorded at a depth of 1,325 m (4,347 ft), the deepest any wolffish has been recorded at, living mainly in the free of the substrate in the water column and occasionally moving up to the surface.

== Biology ==
Northern wolffish use large rocks for shelter and nest building. Late in the year, females lay about 46,500 large eggs (up to 8 mm or 5/16 inch in diameter) which sink to the sea floor, where they are guarded in nests by the males until they hatch. Growth rates are slow, and they mature at five years or older. Their lifespans are at least 12 years. Unlike other wolffishes, northerns have been found off the bottom during both the juvenile and adult stages. The species does not form large schools or undertake long migrations.

This fish feeds in open water on comb jellies and jellyfish, and on bottom-living crustaceans and invertebrates, such as crabs, sea urchins, brittle stars, and starfish.

== Conservation status ==
The northern wolffish is protected under the Canadian federal Species at Risk Act (SARA), where it is classified as a Threatened species. A recovery team for the northern and spotted wolffish has almost completed a recovery strategy and plan for both species. The strategy provides a framework for improving the status of wolffish through an enhanced understanding of their life history, potential sources of harm, and implementing management measures such as live release of captured wolffish. The plan also includes habitat stewardship and educational activities designed to involve stakeholders and inform the public.

In Europe it is regarded as Endangered because of its sedentary habits, the numbers taken as bycatch by fisheries and the threat of anthropogenic climate change. The IUCN inferred that the northeastern Atlantic population has reduced by over 50% in the last three generations.

== Old Woman Fish ==
The Northern wolfish overlaps in range with the Bering wolffish (A. orientalis) in the Bathurst Inlet where the local Inuit do not distinguish between the species, calling both by the name akoak or akoaksaluk ("old woman fish").
