= Rauðisandur =

Coastal area in northwestern Iceland

Coordinates: 65°27′58″N 24°01′48″W

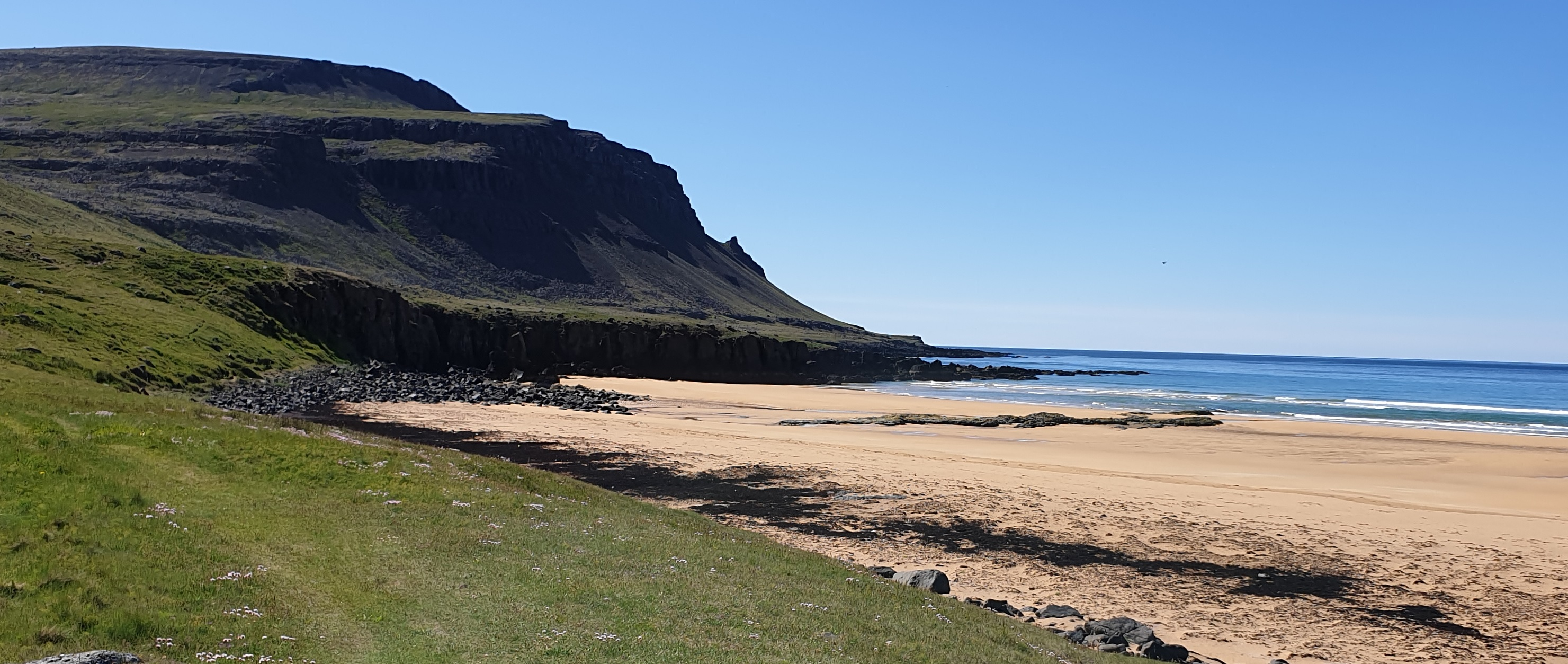
Rauðisandur

Rauðisandur is a coastal area in Westfjords, Iceland. Historically it was located in the historic Vestur-Barðastrandarsýsla county.

== Sjöundá murder ==
Sjöundá is a secluded deserted farm, at the easternmost point of Rauðasandur. In 1802, the farm was the location of a murder, when a man and a woman were murdered by Bjarni Bjarnason and Steinunn Sveinsdóttir. In 1803, King Christian VII sentenced the pair to death, with the execution taking place in 1805.

The author Gunnar Gunnarsson wrote a novel about the events in 1929 called Svartfugl. A play based on the book was staged in the National Theatre of Iceland in 1971.

A later inhabitant of Sjöundá was Tómas Jónsson, born 26 April 1827. In 1884 he emigrated to Canada with his son, who came to be known as Gisli Magnus Thompson, settling at Kross in Gimli, Manitoba.
