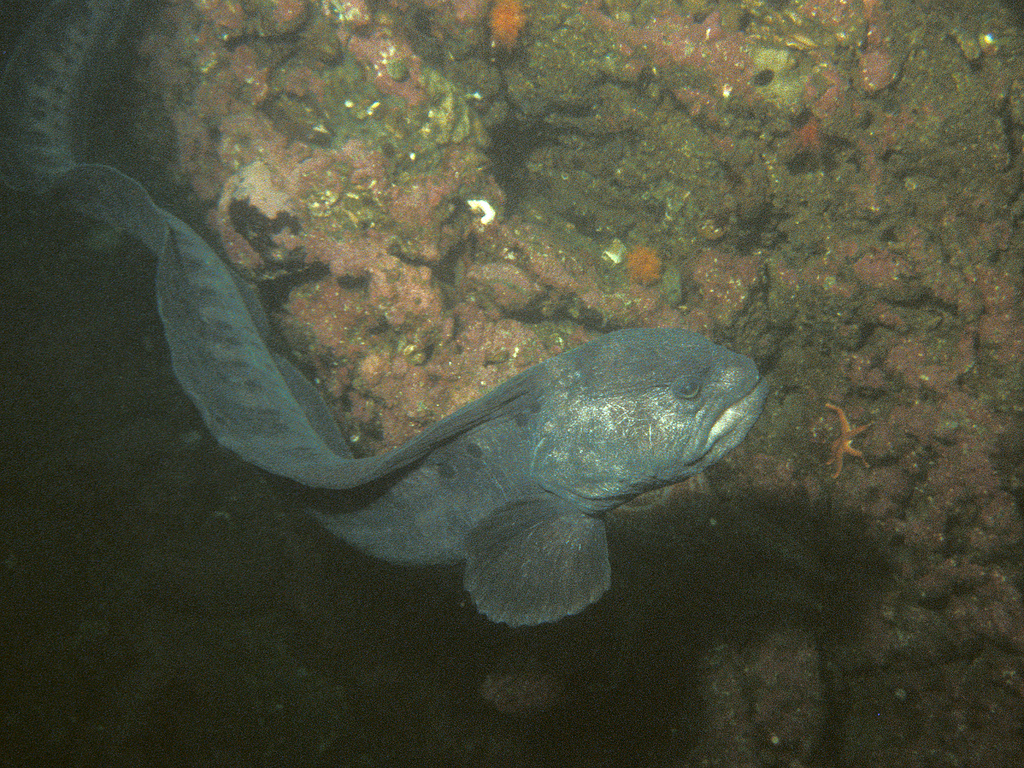
- Wolf eel in Puget Sound

Conservation status
- Least Concern (IUCN 3.1)

Scientific classification
- Kingdom: Animalia
- Phylum: Chordata
- Class: Actinopterygii
- Division: Teleostei
- Order: Perciformes
- Family: Anarhichadidae
- Genus: Anarrhichthys; Ayres, 1855
- Species: A. ocellatus

Binomial name
- Anarrhichthys ocellatus Ayres, 1855

Synonyms
- Anarhichas ocellatus (Ayres, 1855); Anarrhichas felis Girard, 1854; Anarrhichthys felis Girard, 1858

= Wolf eel =

Species of fish

The wolf eel (Anarrhichthys ocellatus) is a species of marine ray-finned fish belonging to the family Anarhichadidae, the wolf fish. It is found in the North Pacific Ocean. Despite its common name and resemblance, it is not a true eel. It is the only species in the monotypic genus Anarrhichthys.

== Taxonomy ==
The wolf eel was first formally described in 1855 by the American physician and ichthyologist William Orville Ayres with the type locality given as San Francisco Bay in California. It is the only species in the monotypic genus Anarrichthys, which was also described by Ayres in 1855. This is one of two genera in the family Anarhichadidae, the other being Anarhichas.

== Etymology ==
The wolf eel's genus name Anarrhichthys combines the wolffish genus Anarhichas, as this taxon has a similar head shape to the wolffishes, and ichthys, which means "fish". The specific name ocellatus means "ocellated", a reference to the eye-like spots, or ocelli, on the dorsal fin and body.

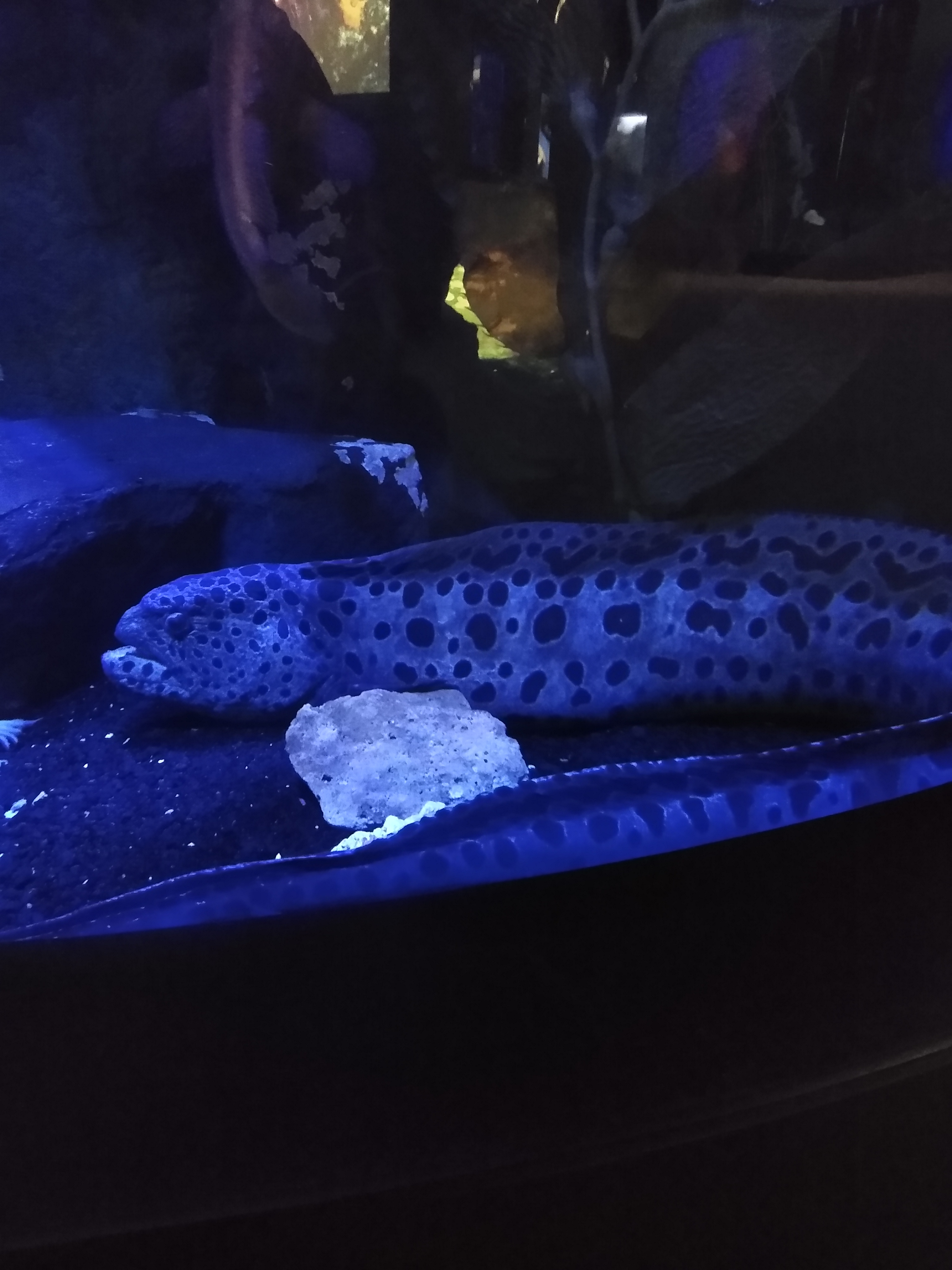
Wolf eel at the Dallas Children's Aquarium

== Description ==
A. ocellatus differs from true eels, as they have paired gill slits and pectoral fins. The animal can grow up to 2.4 m (7 ft 10 in) in length and 18.4 kg (41 lb) in weight.

Younger wolf eels are orange with big dark spots in the posterior part of the body. Once older they turn grey, brown greyish or dark olive.

They possess powerful jaws with which they crush their prey: canine teeth in the front and molars in the posterior portion of the mouth. In the anal fin, it has no rays and 233 radials. It only has one dorsal fin, that extends from the head to the end of the body, with 228 to 250 flexible fishbones without soft radius. The caudal fin is small. It has no pelvic fins, nor a lateral line.

Males have large lips and a protuberance on the superior part of the head. The lifespan of this species is about 20 years.

== Reproduction ==
Wolf eels have a monogamous relationship and tend to mate for life and live in the same cave. They reproduce from October until the end of winter, beginning when they are around seven years old. The male places his head against the female's abdomen and wraps around her, while she extrudes the eggs, up to 10,000 at a time, which he then fertilizes. She coils around the eggs, using her body to shape the eggs into a neat sphere, roughly the size of a grapefruit. The male then coils around her. Together they protect the eggs, and only one leaves the cave at a time, to feed. The eggs hatch after 91 to 112 days, and during this period, in order to ensure their oxygenation, the female circulates water around the eggs and periodically massages and rotates the eggs as they develop.

== Ecology ==
=== Distribution ===
Wolf eel in its habitat

A. ocellatus is found in caves, crevices and rocky reefs from shallow waters to a depth of 226 m (741 ft), ranging from the Sea of Japan and the Bering Sea to Northern California.

=== Behavior ===
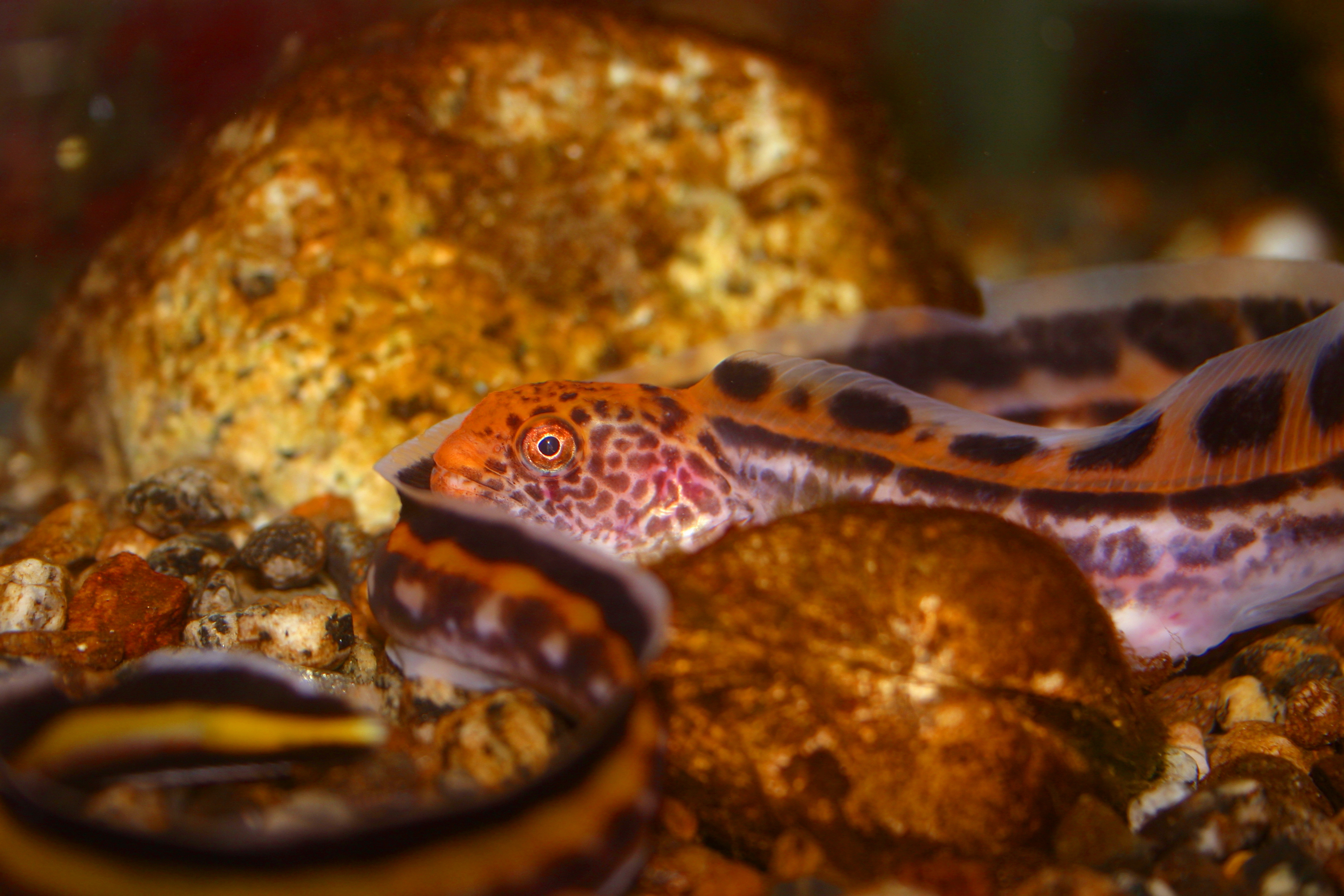
A small juvenile wolf eel

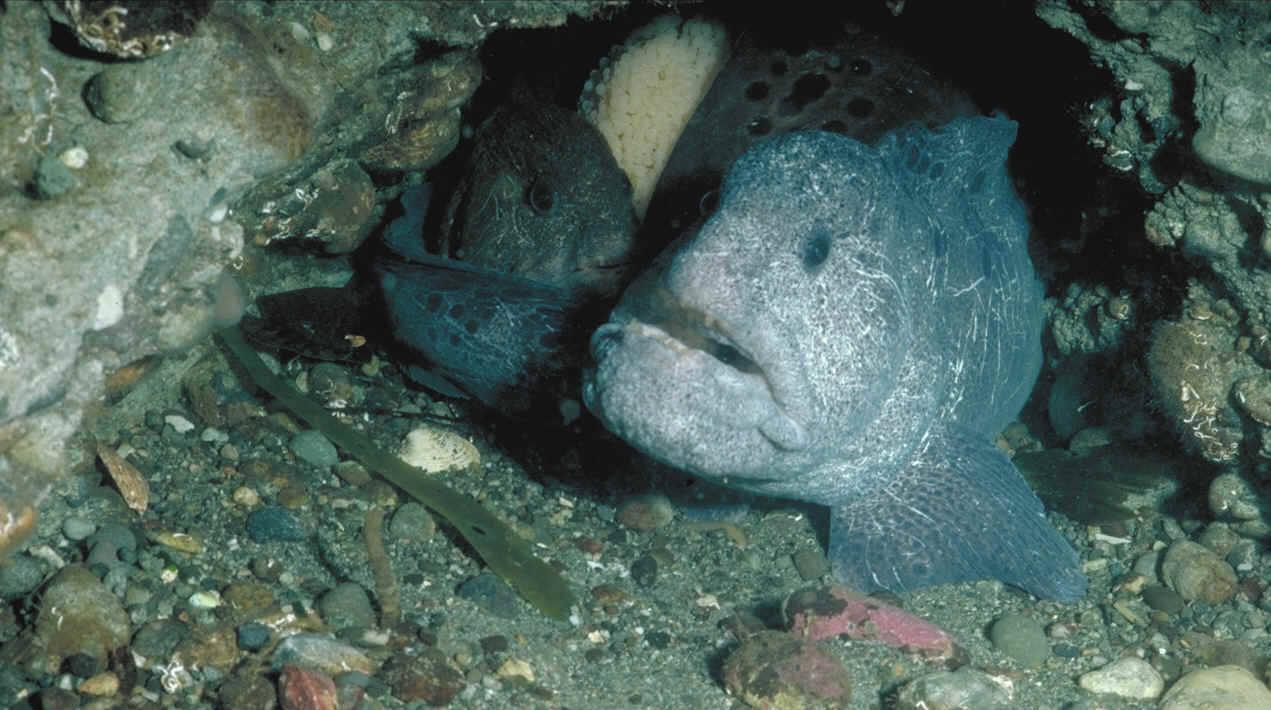
A pair of wolf eel with eggs (pale yellowish)

Large wolf eels are curious and are rarely aggressive, but are capable of inflicting painful bites on humans. The male and female may pair for life and inhabit a cave together; the two watch their eggs together and one always stays behind when the other leaves to feed.

The animal can bite even after its head has been severed.

=== Diet ===
This eel-like fish feeds on invertebrates with hard shells (crustaceans, sea urchins, mussels, clams) and some fishes, crushing them with its strong jaws. It has been observed in captivity that when they are fed soft food such as squid, they tend to prefer it over hard food, which can damage the back teeth.

=== Predators ===
The adult's predators are sharks, big fish and harbor seals. The eggs and juveniles can be threatened by more species. The juveniles are vulnerable as they are not very large and do not have powerful jaws. Fish such as rockfish and kelp greenling will prey on the juveniles.

== As food ==
The wolf eel has edible, sweet and savory white flesh. In some coastal northwest Native American tribes, the wolf eel was referred to as the sacred "doctorfish". Only the tribal healers were allowed to eat this fish, as it was supposed to enhance their healing powers.
