= The Natural History of Iceland =

1752 book by Niels Horrebow

The Natural History of Iceland (Danish: Tilforladelige efterretninger om Island) is a natural history of Iceland by Danish lawyer Niels Horrebow. It was published in Danish in 1752, with an English translation in 1758.

== History of the work ==
The book was intended to correct errors in past natural histories of Iceland, particularly the work of Hamburg mayor Johann Anderson, who had written about the island without ever actually visiting it. Anderson had relied entirely on accounts from German and Dutch sea captains, but Horrebow lived in Iceland for two years, studying the animals, plants, weather, and geological features. He also made note of the cultural practices of the Icelandic people. Horrebow's resulting work was published in Danish in 1752, then translated into German (1753), Dutch (1754), English (1758) and French (1764).

== "Concerning Snakes" ==
The Natural History of Iceland is often noted for its seventy-second chapter, "Concerning Snakes", which, in its English translation, consists solely of one sentence:

No snakes of any kind are to be met with throughout the whole island.

Several works of English literature make light of this brief passage. For example, James Boswell's Life of Johnson (1791) relates how Samuel Johnson bragged to a friend that he could recite the chapter in its entirety. And William Morris' utopian novel News From Nowhere (1890) contains a short chapter called "Concerning Politics", in which a resident of "Nowhere" tells the narrator, "We are very well off as to politics,—because we have none. If you ever make a book out of this conversation, put this in a chapter by itself, after the model of old Horrebow's Snakes in Iceland."

The original Danish version of the chapter on snakes was actually a full paragraph, rather than just one sentence. It was a direct response to a paragraph in Johann Anderson's book, which claimed that snakes could not survive the cold of Iceland. Horrebow's full chapter was translated into English in an 1870 issue of Notes and Queries:

Serpents there are none in Iceland, as our author [Anderson] truly observes. But when he gives as a reason for this the intense cold of that country, he has been led into an error by false information. We have already spoken of the cold in Iceland, and it may be seen from the accompanying meteorological observations that the cold in the South of Iceland is not more severe than with us in Denmark, so that serpents could as easily live there as here. But since these creatures have not come to Iceland it is well, for no one is likely to trouble himself to transplant them thither.

Although the contributor to Notes and Queries remarked that "Horrebow's chapter is ... not so ridiculous as generally supposed", the earlier English translation of the chapter is still much better-known. The phrase "snakes in Iceland" is listed in the Oxford English Dictionary, where it is traced to the 1758 translation and defined as "something posited only to be dismissed as non-existent".
