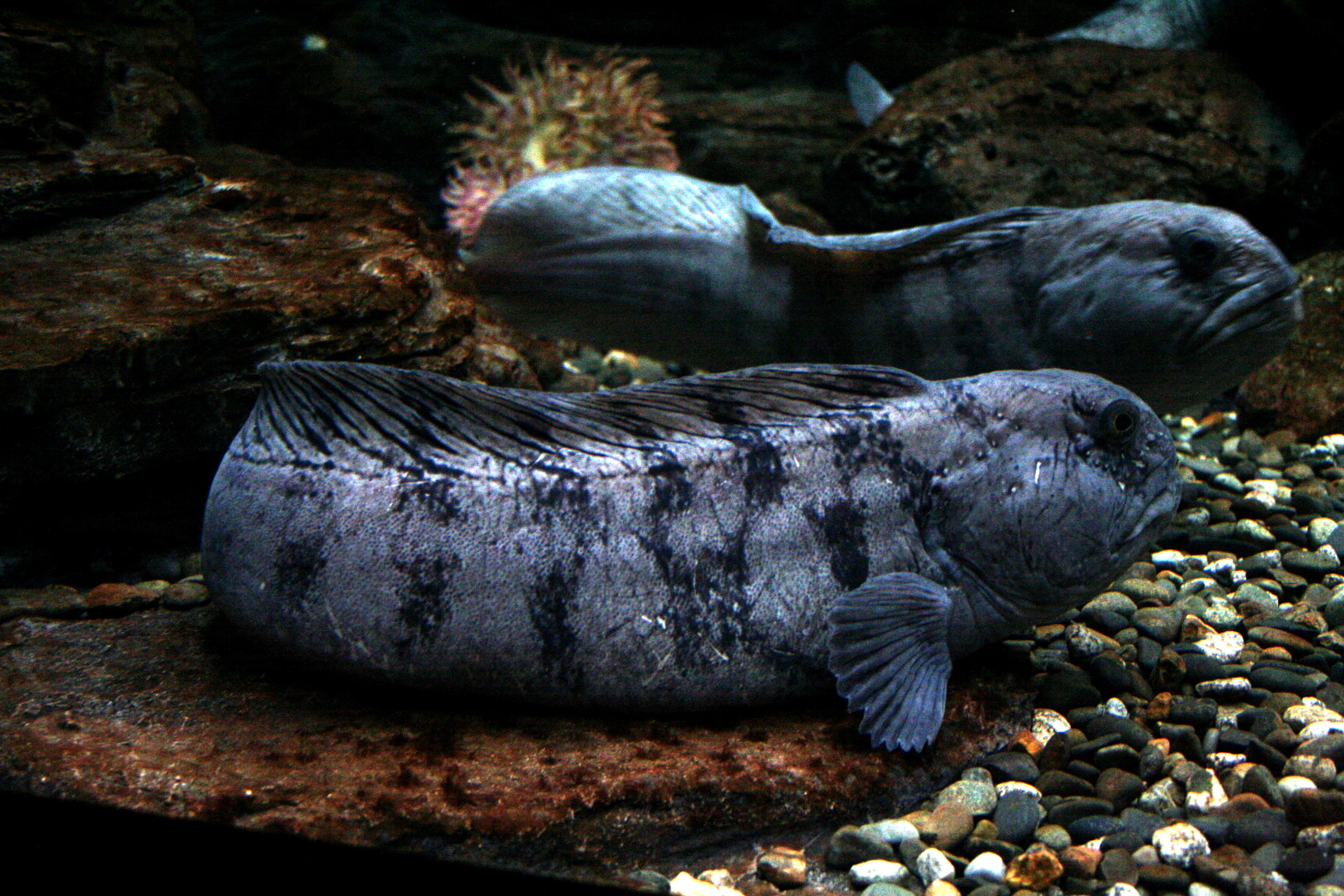
- Atlantic wolffish (A. lupus)
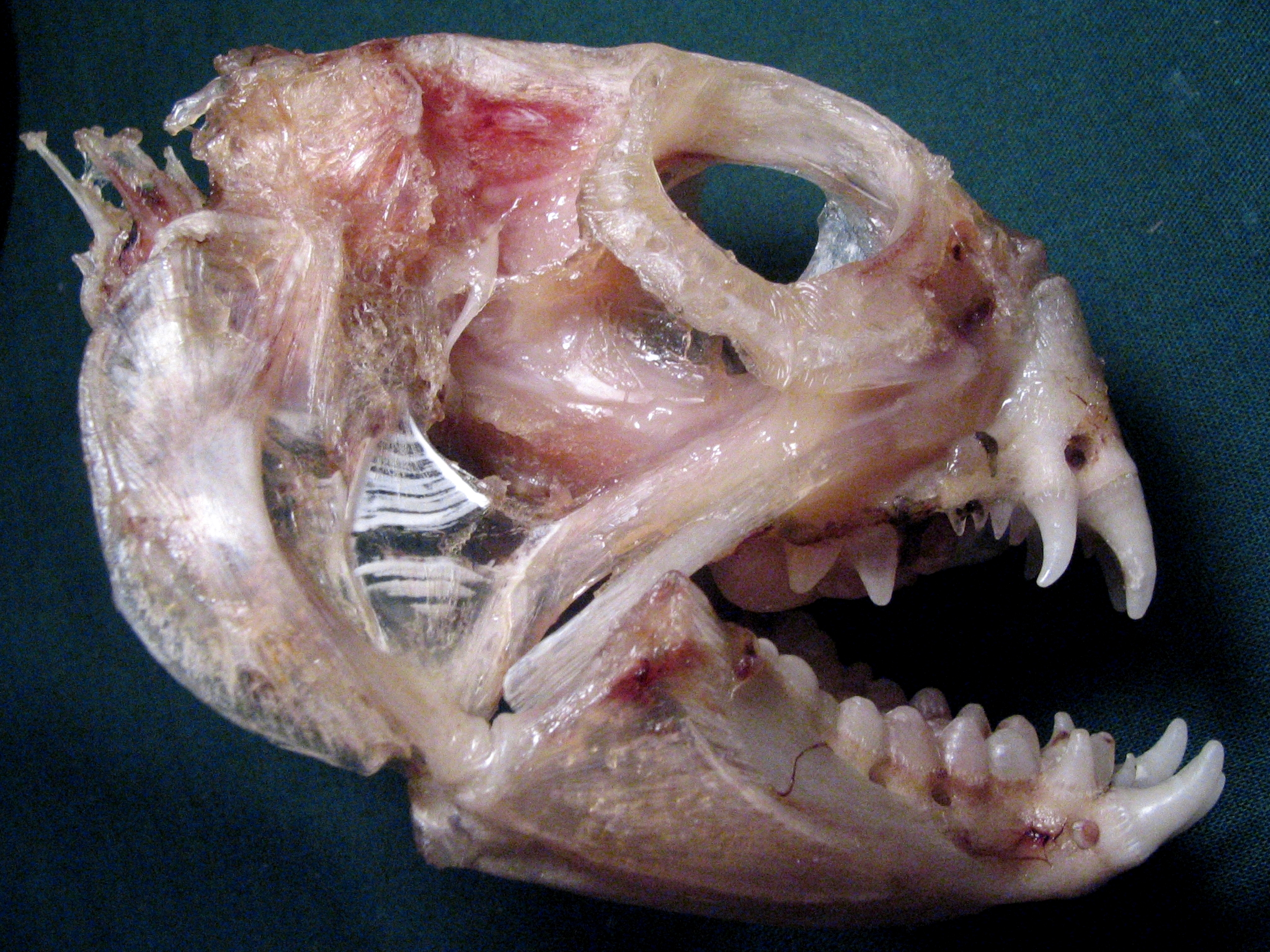
- Skull of A. lupus showing strong dentition

Scientific classification
- Kingdom: Animalia
- Phylum: Chordata
- Class: Actinopterygii
- Division: Teleostei
- Order: Perciformes
- Family: Anarhichadidae
- Genus: Anarhichas; Linnaeus, 1758

Type species
- Anarhichas lupus Linnaeus, 1758

Synonyms
- Lycichthys Gill, 1877

= Anarhichas =

Genus of fishes

Anarhichas is a genus of marine ray-finned fishes belonging to the family Anarhichadidae, the wolffishes or sea wolves. These fishes are found in the northern North Atlantic and North Pacific oceans.

== Taxonomy ==
Anarhichas was first proposed as a genus by Carl Linnaeus in the 10th edition of the Systema Naturae when he described its type species A. lupus, from the "northern English Ocean". The genus is one of two genera in the family Anarhichadidae, which is classified within the order Scorpaeniformes in the suborder Zoarcoidei by the 5th edition of Fishes of the World. The genus name Anarhichas is an Ancient Greek name for the Atlantic wolffish (A. lupus) and means "the climber," in turn derived from the Greek anarrhichesis which means, "to climb or scramble up", this may be an allusion to the ancient belief that wolffishes left the water and climbed up on the rocks.

== Species ==
Anarhichas has four species classified within it:

Image	Scientific name	Distribution
	Anarhichas denticulatus Krøyer, 1845 (Northern wolffish)	North Atlantic Ocean and Arctic Ocean.
	Anarhichas lupus Linnaeus, 1758 (Atlantic wolffish)	North Atlantic Ocean
	Anarhichas minor Ólafsson, 1772 (Spotted wolffish)	Arctic Ocean from north of Russia and the Scandinavian Peninsula to the Scotian Shelf, off Nova Scotia, Canada.
	Anarhichas orientalis Pallas, 1814 (Bering wolffish)	Northeastern Pacific Ocean from Hokkaido to the Sea of Okhotsk, to Alaska.

== Characteristics ==
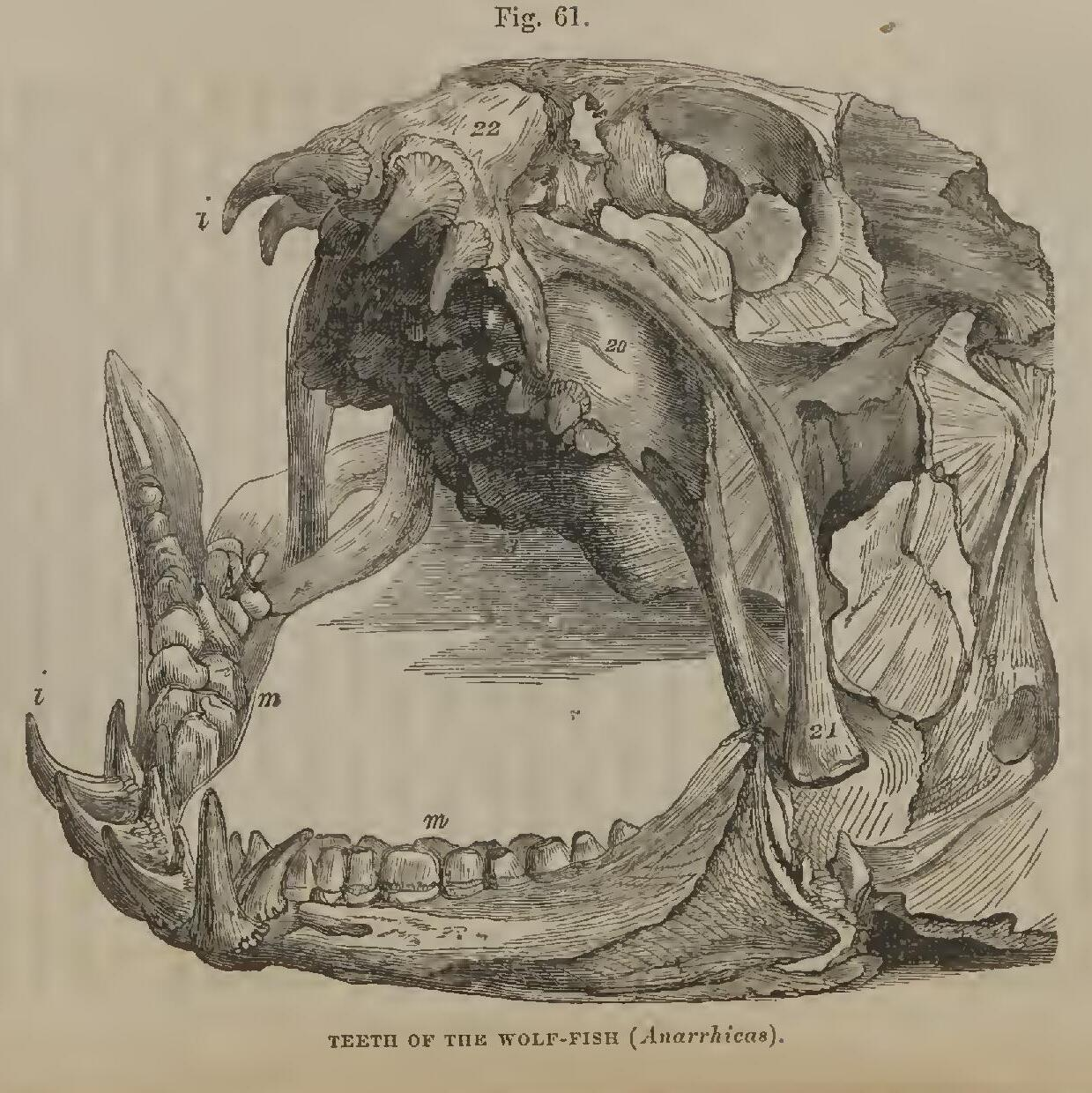
Skull in Anarhichas sp.

Anarhichas wolfishes have a largely compressed and moderately elongate bodies. The long dorsal fin starts at the head and has between 69 and 88 spines. The anal fin contains between 42 and 55 soft rays. The caudal fin is separate from the other median fins. There is a single pair of nostrils. The scales, if present, are cycloid, tiny and do not overlap. There are well developed movement sensitive sensory canals on the head and as the fish ages the pores grow very large. There are 1 or 2 lateral lines made up of superficial neuromasts. There are robust conical teeth in the front of the jaws and large molar-like teeth to the rear of those. The longest published total length is 180 cm (71 in) in the Northern wolffish (A. denticulatus) and the spotted wolffish (A. minor) while the smallest species with a total length of 112 cm (44 in) is the Bering wolffish (A. orientalis).

== Distribution and habitat ==
Anarhichas wolfishes are found in the northern North Atlantic and North Pacific oceans. They are demersal fishes occurring in shallow to moderately deep and cold seas.

== Fisheries ==
Anarhichas wolfishes are caught using bottom trawls, longlines and demersal seines. The landings are used for food, processed into fish oil and the skin can be used to make leather. The species targeted are mainly the Atlantic wolffish and the spotted wolffish.
