= Bjarni Bjarnason (murderer) =

Bjarni Bjarnason (1761-1805), was one of the most well known murderers in the history of Iceland alongside Steinunn Sveinsdóttir.

In 1802, Bjarni Bjarnason and Steinunn Sveinsdóttir mutually murdered their respective spouses in Sjöundá in Iceland. The case became famous as the Morðin á Sjöundá (The Sjöundá Murders). They were both arrested, subjected to torture and sentenced to death. However, it was no longer legal to perform executions on Iceland at that time, so they were to be brought to Norway for their execution. Steinunn died in prison before she could be taken to Norway, but Bjarni was shipped to Norway, where he was executed in 1805.

The case has been the subject of two plays and a novel by Gunnar Gunnarsson, Svartfugl (1938).
