= Anton Paulsen =

Swedish baroque portrait painter

Anton Paulsen (born ca. 1690 in Stockholm, died ca. 1750) was a Swedish baroque portrait painter who was active in Germany and Denmark during the first half of the 18th century. He stayed for extended periods in Altona, Hamburg and Leipzig, and several signed paintings survive. Paulsen is represented in the Hamburg Kunsthalle and other German and Danish museums.
