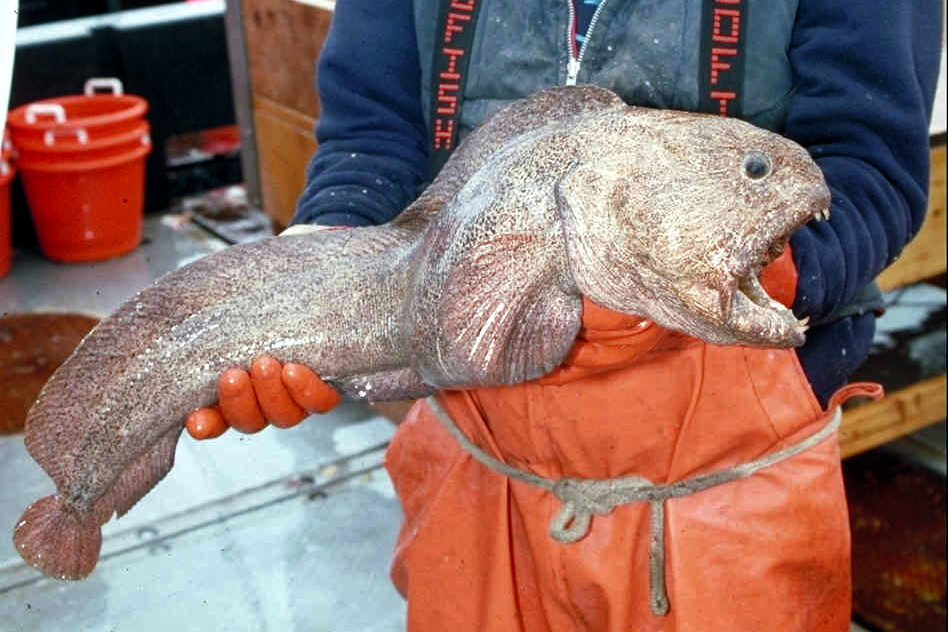

Scientific classification
- Kingdom: Animalia
- Phylum: Chordata
- Class: Actinopterygii
- Order: Perciformes
- Family: Anarhichadidae
- Genus: Anarhichas
- Species: A. orientalis

Binomial name
- Anarhichas orientalis Pallas, 1814

Synonyms
- Anarhichas lepturus Bean, 1879; Anarrichas fasciatus Bleeker, 1873

= Anarhichas orientalis =

Species of fish

Anarhichas orientalis, the Bering wolffish, is a marine fish in the family Anarhichadidae, the "wolffish".

== Description ==
The Bering wolffish has an elongate and laterally compressed body, with a thin caudal peduncle. It has a steep snout, and, like other wolffish, has long, canine teeth that protrude out past the tips of the jaws.

It can grow to 112 cm and 15 kg in weight, is dark brown in colour and lacks any distinct markings other than some slight blotching or palish marbling. The head of juveniles may have multiple dark spots and four to five dark coloured longitudinal stripes on the upper body.

The head length is approximately 19 to 21 percent of the total body length.

This species differs from the five other species in the genus in having at least 53 anal rays, 81 to 86 dorsal fin spines, and more rounded, deeper caudal fins.

== Distribution ==
The Bering wolffish species has an inconsistent distribution. It is found from the Northeastern Pacific Ocean from Hokkaido to the Sea of Okhotsk, to Alaska. Although insufficiently documented, it is also known to occur across the Northwestern Pacific, the Bering Sea and Arctic Ocean.

== Habitat ==
The Bering wolffish lives on rocky, gravel and sandy substrates, and algae-encrusted bottoms in shallow, inshore locations. The Bering wolffish resides in depths of 1-2 to 10-50 meters.

== Behaviour ==
Bering wolffishes are known to practice nesting habits. They produce very big eggs which hatch into larvae remaining in the pelagic zone.

== Diet ==
Benthic invertebrates such as crabs and molluscs.
