= Bjarni Sívertsen =

Icelandic merchant (1763–1833)

Bjarni Sívertsen (baptised Bjarni Sigurðsson) (or Bjarni knight) (1763-1833) was an Icelandic merchant based in Hafnarfjörður and a pioneer in trade and fishing in Iceland. He has been called the father of Hafnarfjörður.

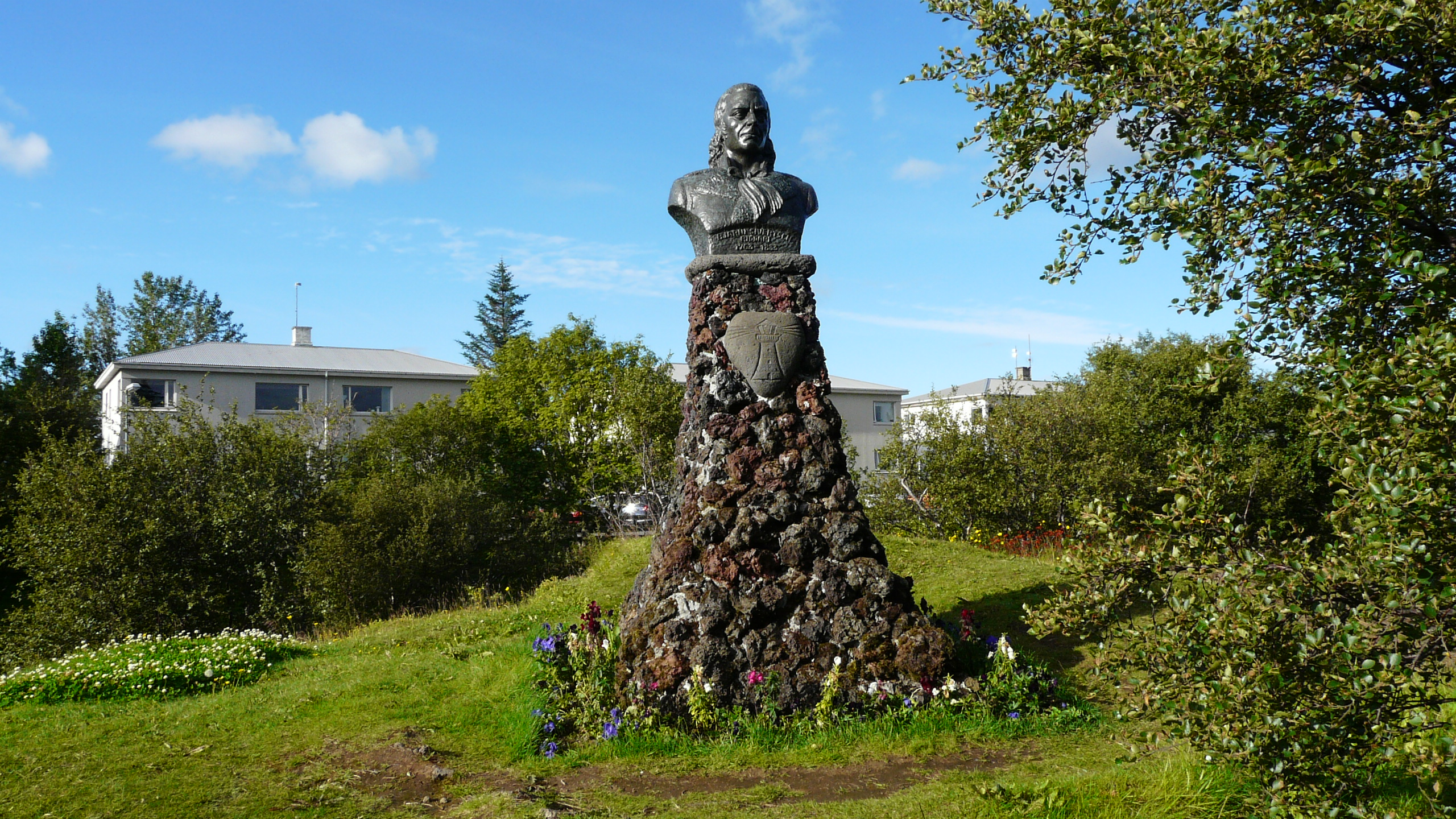
Memorial of Bjarni Sívertsen in Hafnarfjörður

Sívertsen had a house built 1803-1805, which is now part of the Hafnarfjörður Heritage Museum. He received the distinction of Knight of the Dannebrog from the King of Denmark.

Bjarni died in Denmark in July 1833, in an unmarked grave.
