= Steinunn Sveinsdóttir =

Icelandic murderer (1767–1805)

Steinunn Sveinsdóttir (1767–1805), was one of the most well known murderers in the history of Iceland alongside Bjarni Bjarnason (1761-1805).

== Case ==
In 1802, Steinunn Sveinsdóttir and Bjarni Bjarnason mutually murdered their respective spouses in Sjöundá in Iceland. The case became famous as the Morðin á Sjöundá (The Sjöundá Murders). They were both arrested, subjected to torture and sentenced to death. However, it was no longer legal to perform executions on Iceland at that time, so they were to be brought to Norway for their execution. Steinunn Sveinsdóttir died in prison before she could be taken to Norway, but Bjarni Bjarnason was shipped to Norway, where he was executed in 1805.

== Popular culture ==
The case has been the subject of two plays and a novel by Gunnar Gunnarsson, Svartfugl (1938).
