= Johann Anderson (naturalist) =

German politician and lawyer (1674–1743)

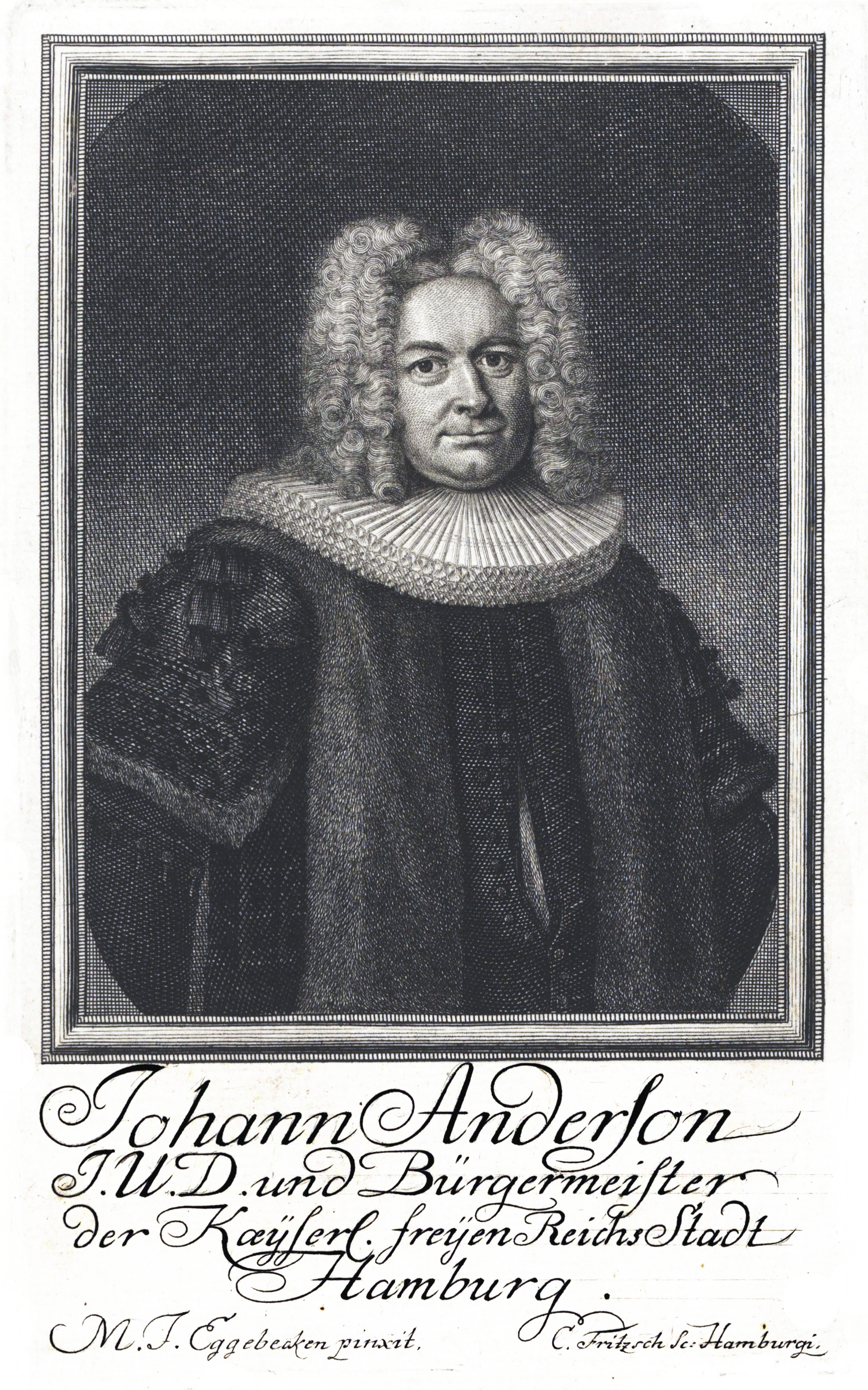
Portrait engraving by Christian Fritzsch in 1728

Johann Anderson (14 March 1674 – 3 May 1743) was a German lawyer, naturalist, linguist, and writer who became a mayor of Hamburg. He was among the first to write about travels to Greenland, and his work was published posthumously in 1746 as Nachrichten von Island und Grönland. Anderson was born in Hamburg, the son of a merchant and whaling ship owner Ammon. He studied law at Leipzig from 1694 and then went to Halle and obtained a doctorate from Leiden with a dissertation titled De iuramento Zenoniano. He also became interested in natural history and his acquaintances included Anton van Leeuwenhoek. He returned to Hamburg in 1697 and worked as a lawyer. In 1702 he became a council secretary and became a syndic in 1708. He was involved in a treaty with the British dealing with trade in salted herrings. In 1723 he became mayor of the city of Hamburg and was in the position until his death.

Anderson collected information on Iceland and Greenland from sailors and others but he did not travel himself. He began to compile a grammar and vocabulary of the Inuit of Greenland.

Anderson was elected to the Leopoldina Academy in 1731 under the pseudonym Marcus Cato. He married Margaretha, daughter of Hamburg mayor Peter von Lengerke and they had a son, also named Johann Anderson (1717–1790) who was mayor of Hamburg between 1783 and 1790.
