= Eggert Ólafsson =

Icelandic explorer and writer (1726–1768)

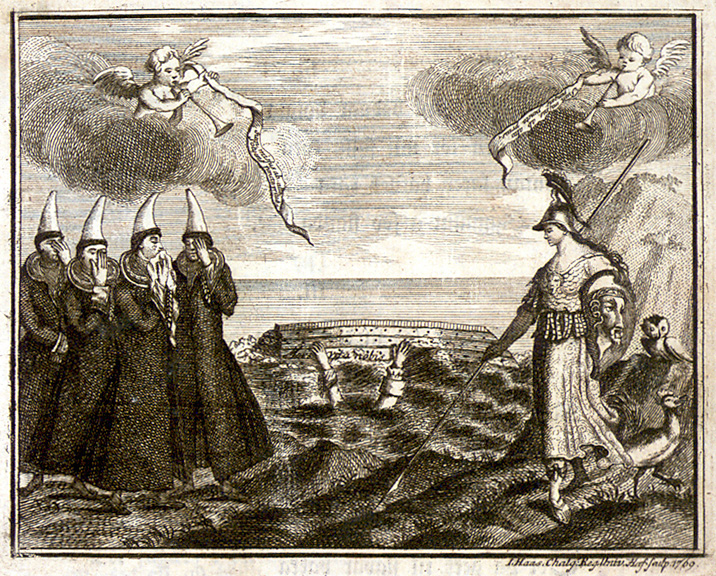
Copper engraving depicting Eggert Ólafsson's death

Eggert Ólafsson (1 December 1726 – 30 May 1768) was an Icelandic explorer, writer and conservator of the Icelandic language. He also worked to revive the Icelandic culture and economy.

== Background ==
He was the son of a farmer from Svefneyjar in Breiðafjörður. He studied natural sciences, Classics, Grammar, Law, and Agriculture at the University of Copenhagen. He obtained a bachelor's degree from the University of Copenhagen. In 1772 he posthumously published Reise igiennem Island (Travels in Iceland), an account of the scientific and cultural survey he conducted between 1752 and 1757. The book remains a seminal work on Iceland and its people.

Eggert wrote on a wide range of topics. His writing has made him known for his pro-conservation stance on the Icelandic language, which has undergone significant change since the 18th century.

Eggert was a devout patriot, and his literary works, chiefly his poems, burn with this fervor. He used his writings to stir up patriotism, which he felt was waning. He hoped to revive Icelandic culturally and politically, so that it would rise once again to its former glory.

He went on a research trip around Iceland with Bjarni Pálsson (who later became Iceland's Director of Health) between 1752 and 1757. During this trip, they visited a great number of Icelandic natural sites and proposed geographical and infrastructural improvements to the regions they visited.

Eggert and his wife, Ingibjörg Halldórsdóttir, drowned in 1768 when going back home from a winter sojourn in Sauðlauksdalur. Their boat capsized in Breiðafjörður off the north-west coast of Iceland. Matthías Jochumsson wrote a commemorative poem titled "Eggert Ólafsson" in his honour. Icelandic romantic poet Jónas Hallgrímsson also wrote a poem for Ólafsson; entitled "Hulduljóð", it was never finished.

According to the historian Guðmundur Hálfdanarson, Eggert "is often regarded as the precursor of Icelandic nationalism."
