= Otto von Rantzau =

Danish count and government official

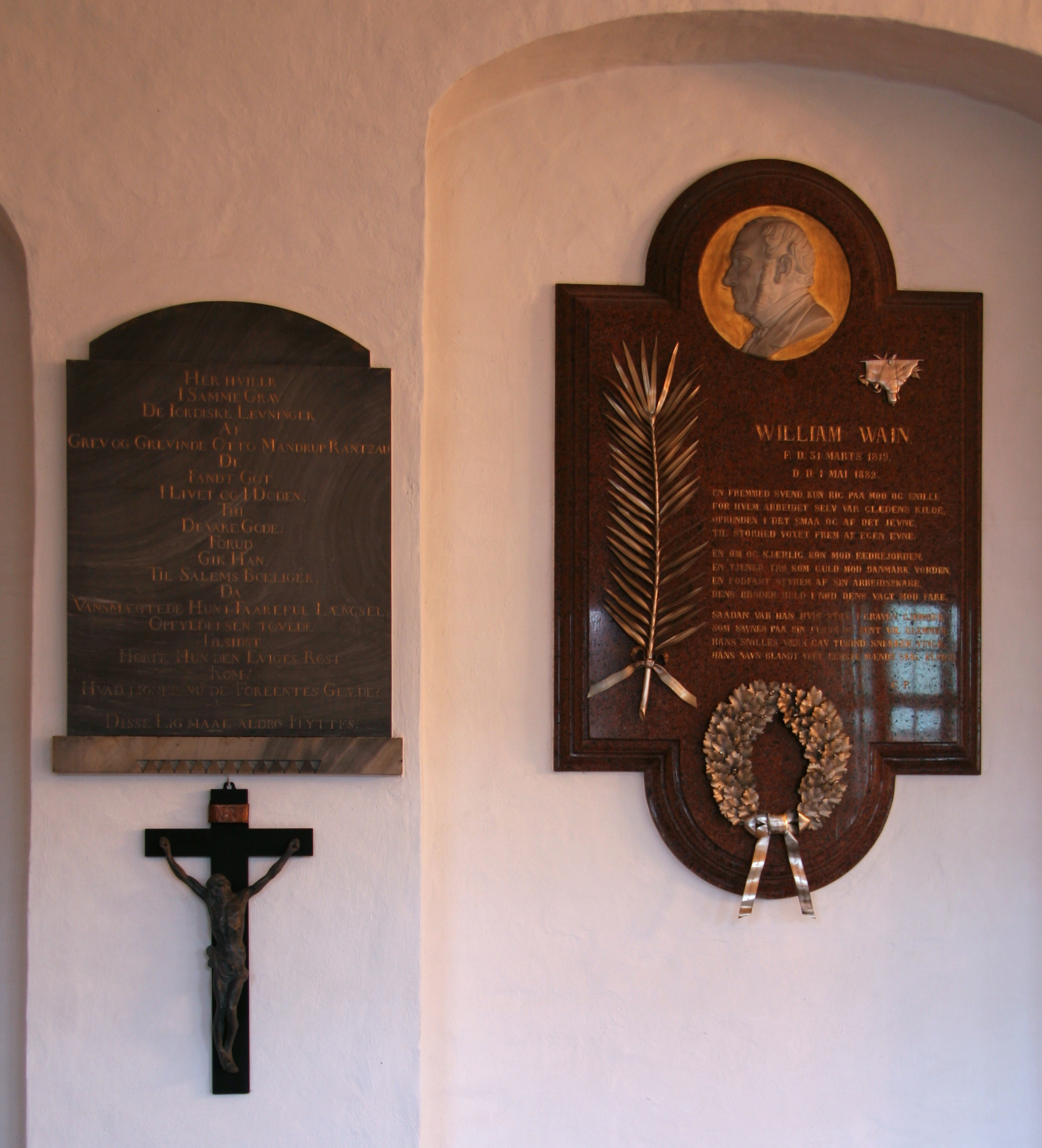
Epitaph to Rantzau (left) in Holmen Church in Copenhagen. The memorial to the right commemorates Wiliam Wain, co-founder of Burmeister & Wain.

Otto Manderup von Rantzau (22 May 1719 – 2 October 1768) was a Danish count and civil servant who was governor of Iceland and the Faroe Islands from 1750 until his death.

== Biography ==
Rantzau was the son of Count Christian Rantzau (d. 1771), who was at one time one of Denmark's highest officials and governor of Norway for a time, and his wife Eleonore Hedevig von Plessen.
