= 1738 in Iceland =

- Decades: 1730s; 1740s; 1750s
- See also: Other events in 1739 · Timeline of Icelandic history

Events in the year 1738 in Iceland.

== Incumbents ==
- Monarch: Christian VI
- Governor of Iceland: Henrik Ochsen

== Births ==
- 11 February: Jón Jakobsson, the sýslumaður (magistrate) for the Eyjafjörður region.
