= 1746 in Iceland =

- Decades: 1730s; 1740s; 1750s; 1760s
- See also: Other events in 1746 · Timeline of Icelandic history

Events in the year 1746 in Iceland.

== Incumbents ==
- Monarch: Christian VI (until 6 August);Frederick V onwards
- Governor of Iceland: Henrik Ochsen

== Events ==
- 6 August: Christian VI dies in Hirschholm Palace, Copenhagen, with Frederick V taking over as Monarch.
- A volcanic eruption took place near Lake Mývatn.
