= 1745 in Iceland =

- Decades: 1730s; 1740s; 1750s; 1760s
- See also: Other events in 1745 · Timeline of Icelandic history

Events in the year 1745 in Iceland.

== Incumbents ==
- Monarch: Christian VI
- Governor of Iceland: Henrik Ochsen

== Events ==
- Ludvig Harboe returned to Copenhagen after spending four years in Iceland, serving as Bishop of Hólar from 1741 to 1745 and Bishop of Skálholt from 1744 to 1745.
- Halldór Brynjólfsson was chosen Bishop of Hólar.
- Iceland's first primary school was established in the Westman Islands.

== Deaths ==
- 3 December: Eyjólfur Jónsson, chronicler and priest at Vellir in Svarfaðardalur.
