= 1961 in Iceland =

- Decades: 1940s; 1950s; 1960s; 1970s; 1980s
- See also: Other events of 1961; Timeline of Icelandic history

The following lists events that happened in 1961 in Iceland.

== Incumbents ==
- President – Ásgeir Ásgeirsson
- Prime Minister – Ólafur Thors, Bjarni Benediktsson

== Events ==
- 11 March - The Althing approves a resolution ending the First Cod War
- October 26-December 16 -Vikrahraun basaltic eruption

== Births ==
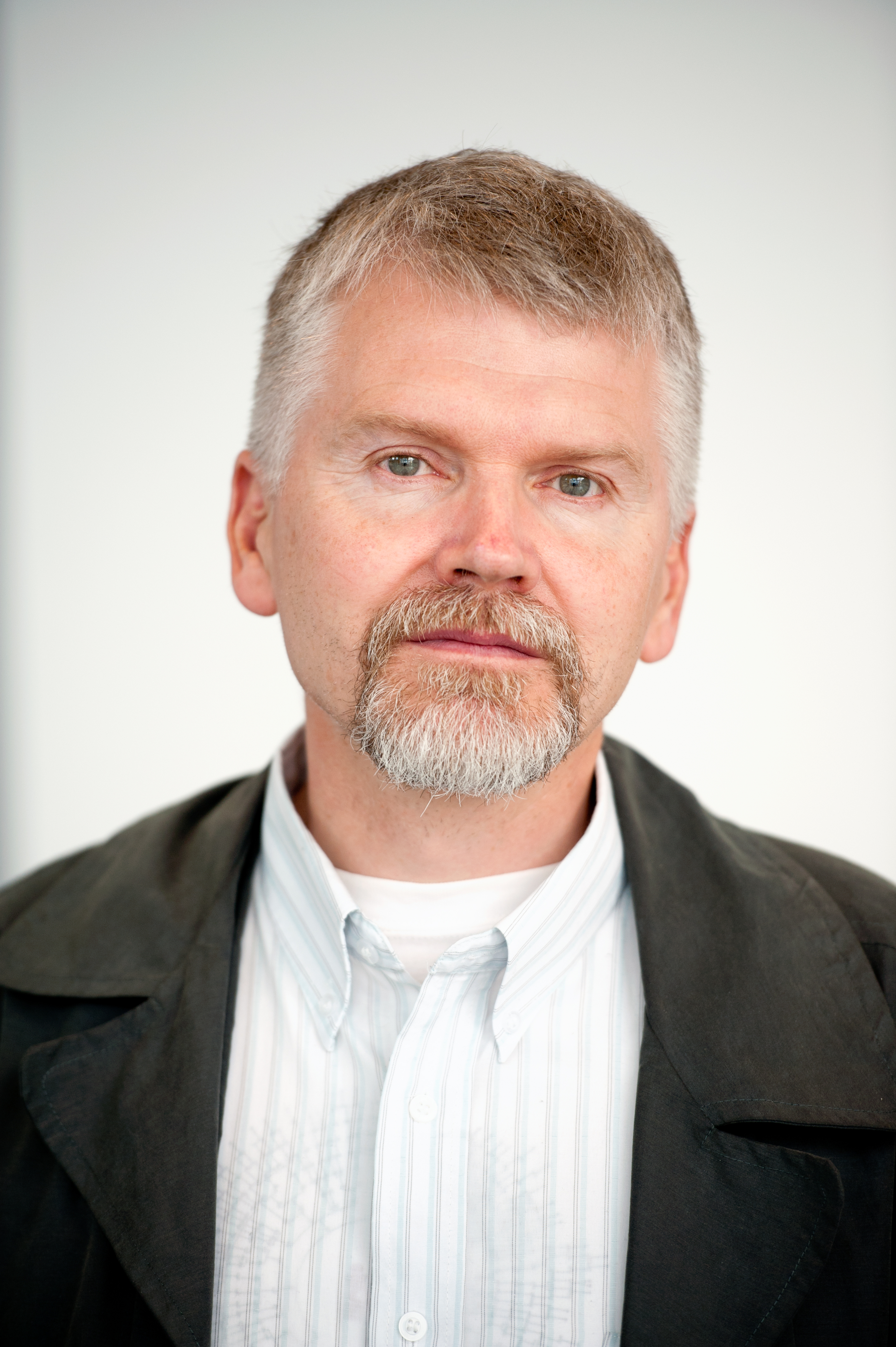
Gyrðir Elíasson

- 4 January – Gunnar Gíslason, footballer
- 4 April – Gyrðir Elíasson, writer
- 23 April – Þröstur Leó Gunnarsson, actor
- 30 April – Arnór Guðjohnsen, footballer
- 23 July – Kristján Arason, handball player.
- 12 December – Lárus Guðmundsson, footballer
- 13 December – Guðmundur Torfason, footballer

=== Full date missing ===
- Arnaldur Indriðason, writer of crime fiction
