= 1969 in Iceland =

- Decades: 1940s; 1950s; 1960s; 1970s; 1980s
- See also: Other events of 1969; Timeline of Icelandic history

The following lists events that happened in 1969 in Iceland.

== Incumbents ==
- President – Kristján Eldjárn
- Prime Minister – Bjarni Benediktsson

== Events ==
- March 26 - Landnemar Scout Association was founded in Hlíðar in Reykjavík.
- July 1 - The KR table tennis league was founded in Reykjavík.
- October 3 - The Smyrlabjarga power plant was officially commissioned in Iceland.

== Births ==
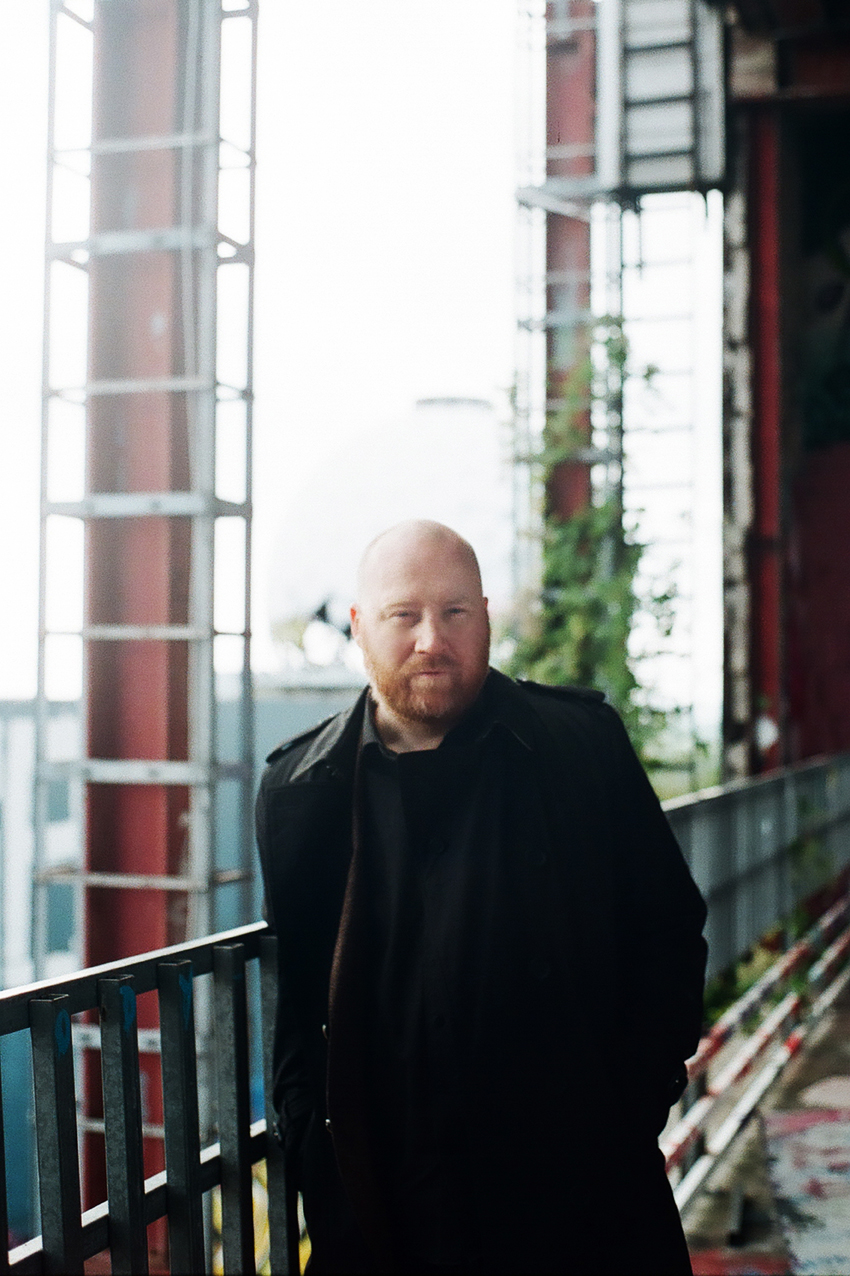
Jóhann Jóhannsson

- 26 August – Daníel Ágúst Haraldsson, Musical artist
- 5 September – Rúnar Kristinsson, footballer
- 19 September – Jóhann Jóhannsson, composer (d. 2018)
- 12 November – Helena Ólafsdóttir, footballer

== Deaths ==
- 29 May – Ásmundur Guðmundsson, the ninth Bishop of Iceland, served in office in 1954-1959 (b. 1888)
