= 1963 in Iceland =

- Decades: 1940s; 1950s; 1960s; 1970s; 1980s
- See also: Other events of 1963; Timeline of Icelandic history

The following lists events that happened in 1963 in Iceland.

== Incumbents ==
- President – Ásgeir Ásgeirsson
- Prime Minister – Ólafur Thors, Bjarni Benediktsson

== Events ==
- 14 November – The island of Surtsey is formed following a volcanic eruption off the coast of Iceland.

== Births ==
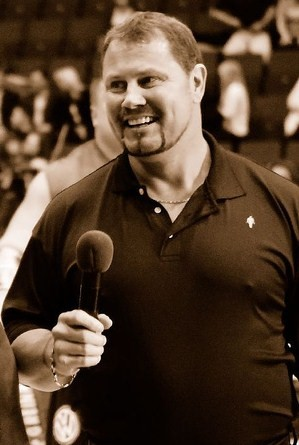
Magnús Ver Magnússon

- 17 January – Tryggvi Þór Herbertsson, politician
- 17 March – Willum Þór Þórsson, footballer
- 22 April – Magnús Ver Magnússon, powerlifter and strongman
- 2 June – Nanna Leifsdóttir, alpine skier.
- 30 June – Óskar Jónasson, film director and screenwriter
- 11 November – Þórhallur Gunnarsson, actor and media personality
- 24 November – Kristín Helga Gunnarsdóttir, children's writer

== Deaths ==
Hildur Sólveig Magnússon Urður tása tjörvadóttir
