= 1740 in Iceland =

- Decades: 1730s; 1740s; 1750s; 1760s
- See also: Other events in 1740 · Timeline of Icelandic history

Events in the year 1740 in Iceland.

== Incumbents ==
- Monarch: Christian VI
- Governor of Iceland: Henrik Ochsen

== Events ==
- Ásmundur Þórðarson was executed for the murder of a young man in Hegranessýsla named Guðmundur.
