= 1965 in Iceland =

- Decades: 1940s; 1950s; 1960s; 1970s; 1980s
- See also: Other events of 1965; Timeline of Icelandic history

The following lists events that occurred in 1965 in Iceland.

== Incumbents ==
- President – Ásgeir Ásgeirsson
- Prime Minister – Bjarni Benediktsson

== Births ==
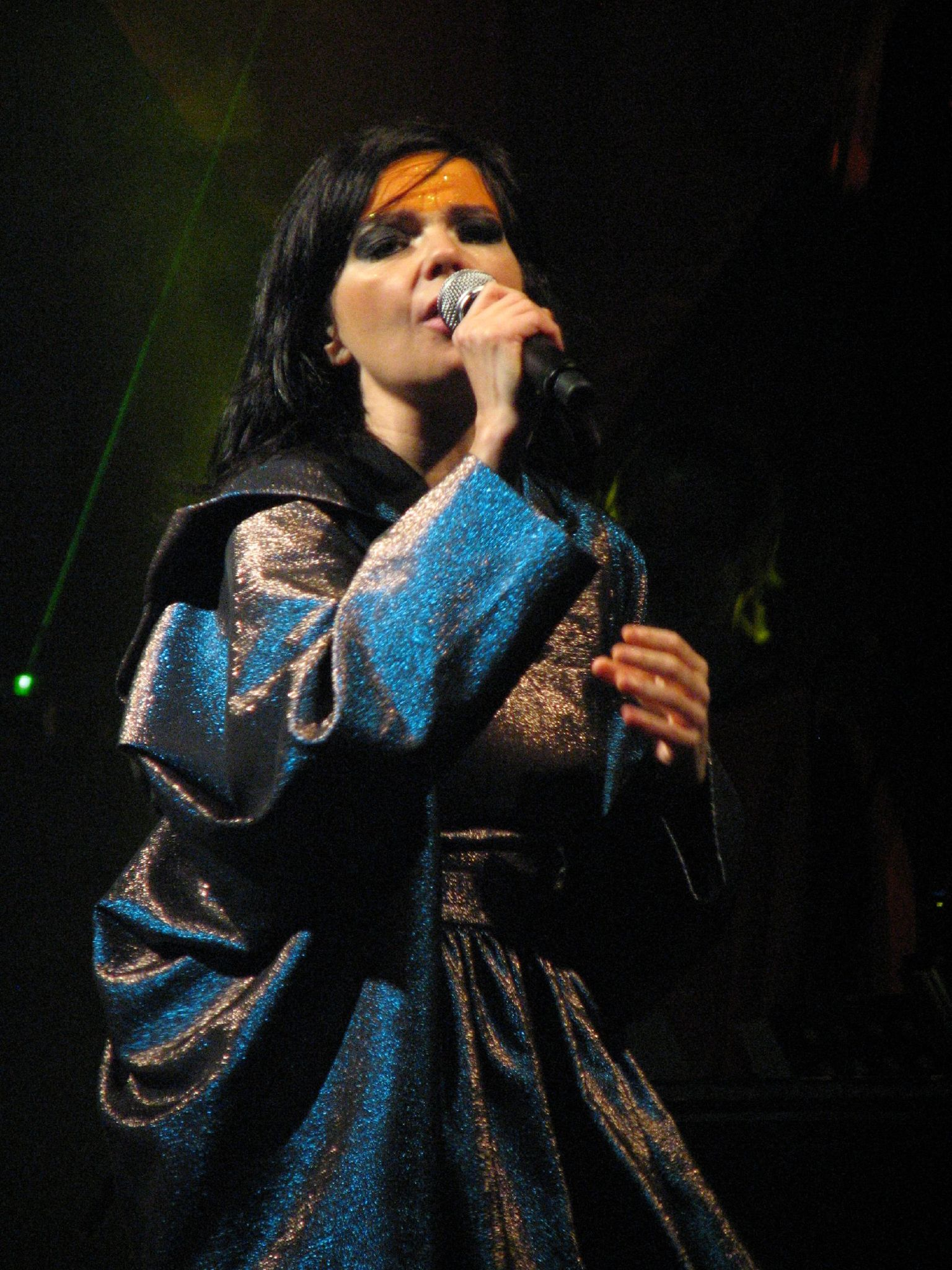
Björk

- 27 February – Bjarkey Gunnarsdóttir, politician.
- 20 March – Vigdís Hauksdóttir, politician.
- 17 April – Andrés Guðmundsson, strongman
- 14 July – Þórdís Gísladóttir, children's writer, poet, novelist, and textbook writer
- 21 July – Guðni Bergsson, footballer
- 24 July – Disa Eythorsdottir, bridge player
- 1 November – Björk, singer-songwriter
