= Bjarni Benediktsson =

Bjarni Benediktsson may refer to:

- Bjarni Benediktsson (born 1908) (1908–1970), Prime Minister of Iceland from 1963 to 1970
- Bjarni Benediktsson (born 1970), Prime Minister of Iceland in 2017 and 2024, and leader of the Independence Party since 2009
