= 1964 in Iceland =

- Decades: 1940s; 1950s; 1960s; 1970s; 1980s
- See also: Other events of 1964; Timeline of Icelandic history

The following lists events that happened in 1964 in Iceland.

== Incumbents ==
- President – Ásgeir Ásgeirsson
- Prime Minister – Bjarni Benediktsson

== Events ==
- 16 July - Prince Philip, Duke of Edinburgh and his son the Prince of Wales (now Charles III) visited Reykjavik
- 17 August - Liverpool FC play their first match in Iceland, beating KR Reykjavik 5-0
- 20 September - One of three single-engine planes en route from Halifax to Europe ditches in the sea off Iceland. The pilot is rescued by helicopter. Another is lost entirely and the third lands safely in Reykjavik.
- 4 November - Prime Minister Bjarni Benediktsson paid a visit to Israel and met with Israeli prime minister Levi Eshkol.

== Births ==
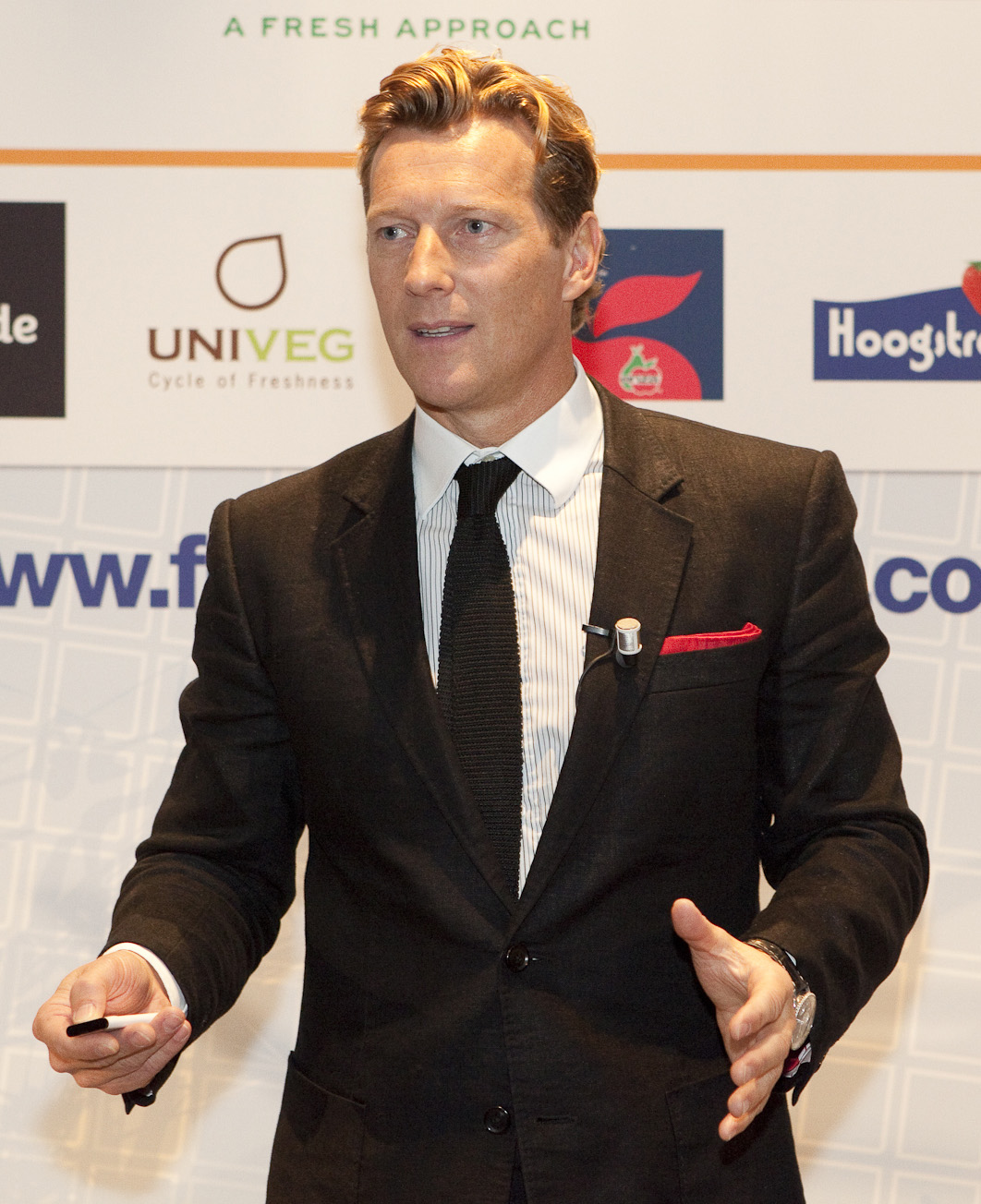
Magnús Scheving

- 22 January – María Ellingsen, actress
- 27 January – Geir Sveinsson, handball player.
- 23 April – Halla Margrét Árnadóttir, singer
- 27 April – Thorir Hergeirsson, handballer
- 29 April – Lúðvík Bergvinsson, politician
- 2 August – Einar Thor, film director
- 24 August – Svandís Svavarsdóttir, politician
- 10 November – Magnús Scheving, writer, actor and entrepreneur
