= Waage =

Waage is a Norwegian surname. Notable people with the surname include:

- Anita Waage (born 1971), Norwegian footballer
- Benedikt G. Waage (1889–1966), Icelandic athlete and businessman
- Dorothy B. Waage (1905–1997), American numismatist
- Elsa Waage (born 1959), Icelandic opera singer
- Geir Waage (born 1967), Norwegian politician
- Hilde Waage (born 1959), Norwegian historian
- Hjalmar Waage (1892–1939), Norwegian newspaper editor and writer
- Hjelm Waage (1866–1947), Norwegian politician
- Inger Waage (1923–1995), Norwegian ceramist
- Peter Waage (1833–1900), Norwegian chemist
- Roy Waage (born 1963), Norwegian politician
- Trond Waage (born 1953), Norwegian activist
