= 1968 in Iceland =

- Decades: 1940s; 1950s; 1960s; 1970s; 1980s
- See also: Other events of 1968; Timeline of Icelandic history

The following lists events that happened in 1968 in Iceland.

== Incumbents ==
- President – Ásgeir Ásgeirsson, Kristján Eldjárn
- Prime Minister – Bjarni Benediktsson

== Events ==
Hægri dagurinn or H-dagurinn happened in May, when Iceland switched from left-hand traffic to right hand traffic

== Births ==
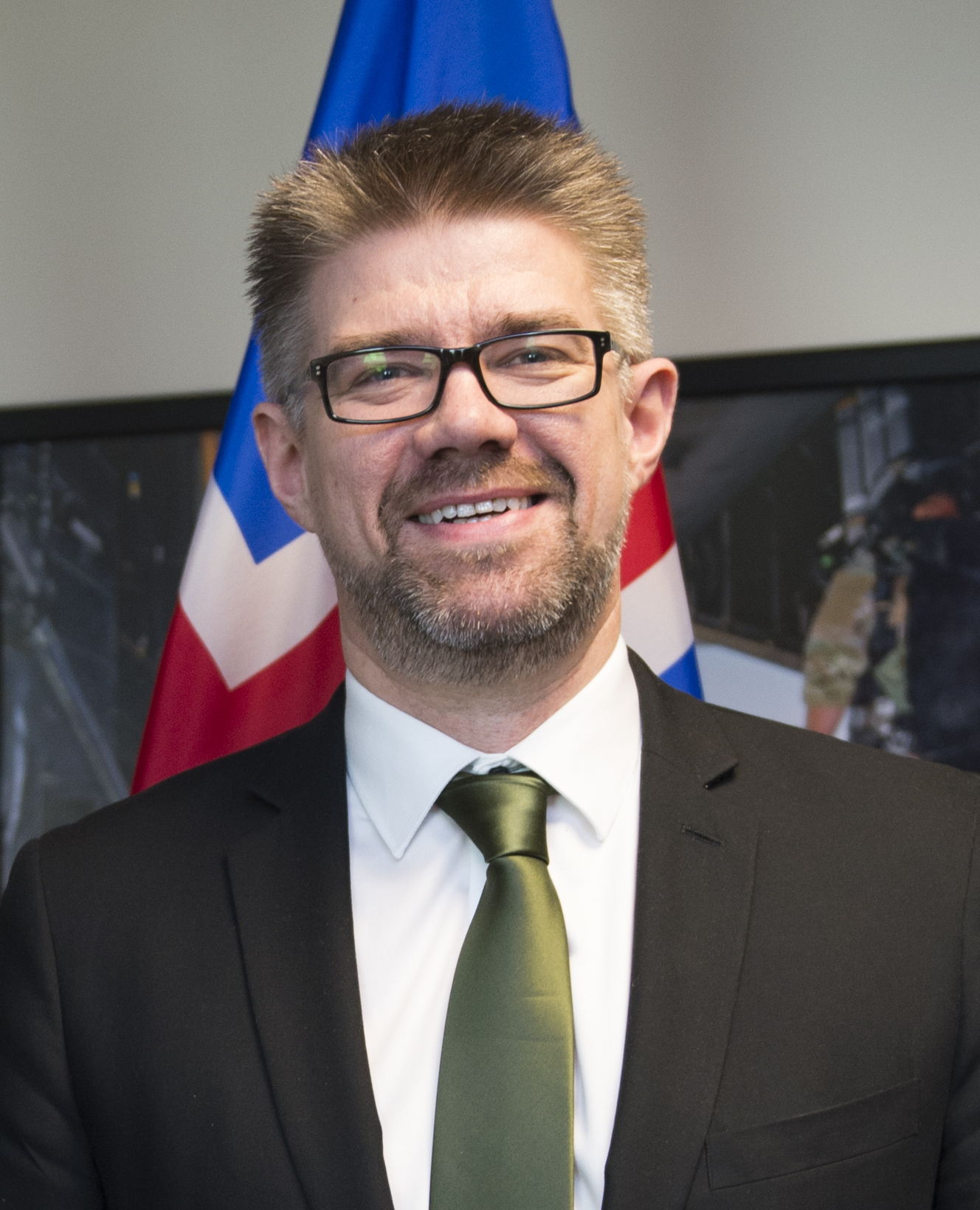
Gunnar Bragi Sveinsson

- 12 March – Ólafur Gottskálksson, footballer
- 14 March – Magnús Árni Magnússon, politician
- 20 May – Ólafur Kristjánsson, footballer
- 29 May – Sigríður Ingibjörg Ingadóttir, economist and politician.
- 9 June – Gunnar Bragi Sveinsson, politician.
- 25 June – Sigursteinn Gíslason, footballer (d. 2012).
- 26 June – Guðni Th. Jóhannesson, historian
- 29 July – Brynhildur Davíðsdóttir, scientist

== Deaths ==
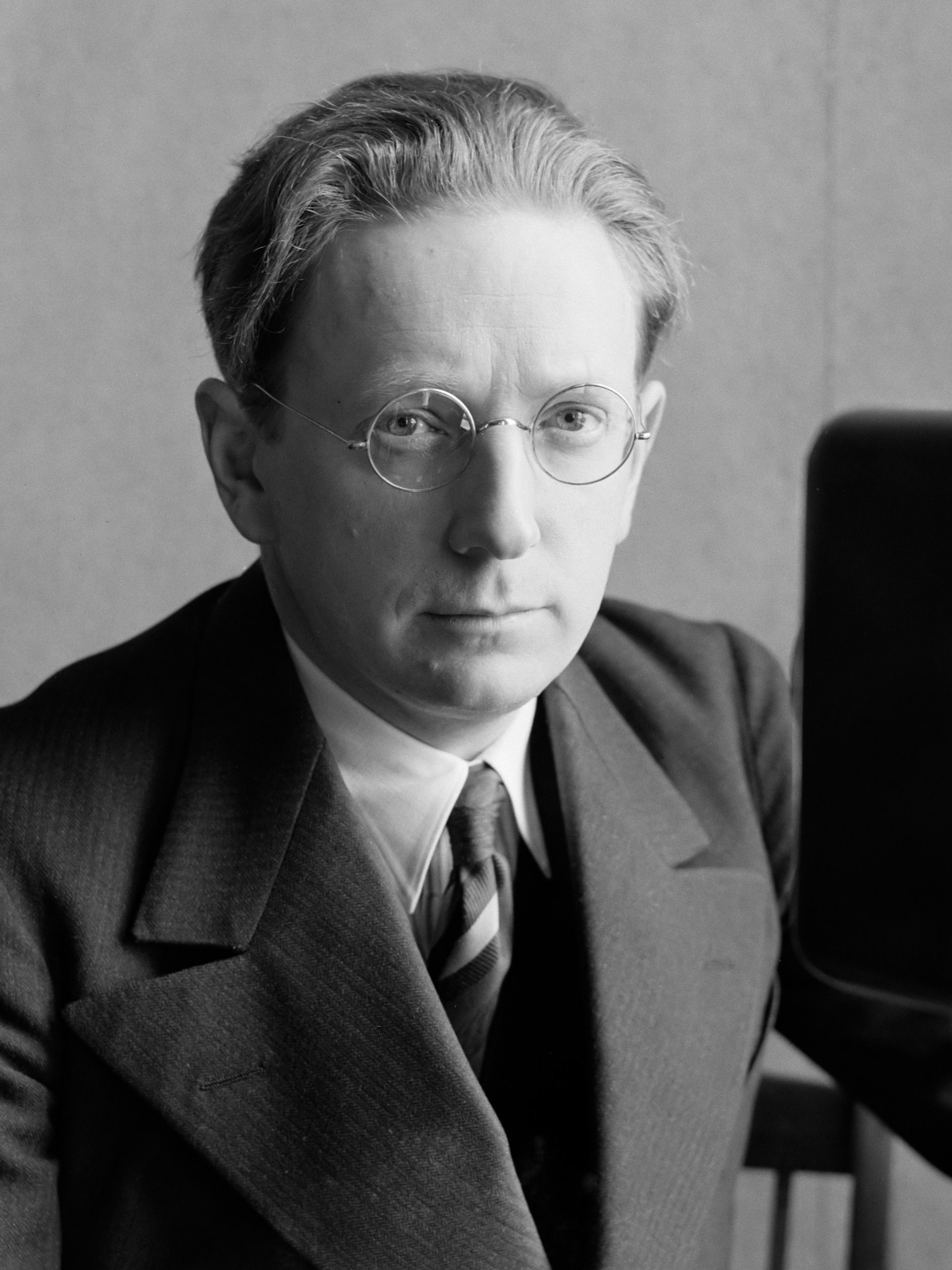
Jón Leifs

- 18 June – Nína Tryggvadóttir, artist (b. 1913)
- 30 July – Jón Leifs, composer, pianist, and conductor (b. 1899)

=== Full date missing ===
- Gunnfríður Jónsdóttir, sculptor (b. 1889)
