= 1966 in Iceland =

- Decades: 1940s; 1950s; 1960s; 1970s; 1980s
- See also: Other events of 1966; Timeline of Icelandic history

The following lists events that happened in 1966 in Iceland.

== Incumbents ==
- President – Ásgeir Ásgeirsson
- Prime Minister – Bjarni Benediktsson

== Events ==
September 1966: Television came to Iceland.

== Births ==
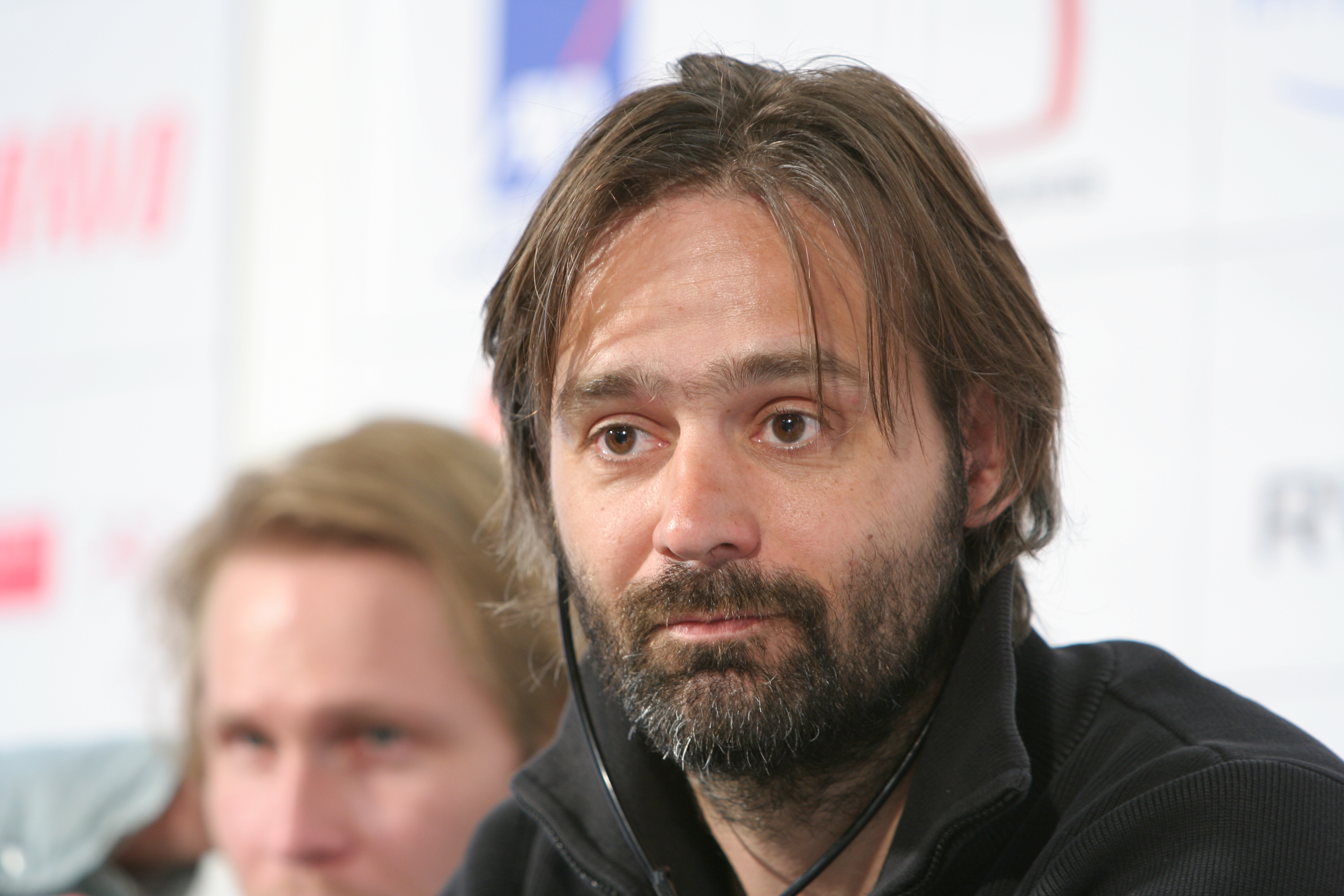
Baltasar Kormákur

- 23 January – Haraldur Benediktsson, politician
- 27 February – Baltasar Kormákur, actor, theater and film director, and film producer
- 10 March – Margrét Vilhjálmsdóttir, actress
- 23 May – Árni Páll Árnason, politician.
- 31 August – Eagle Egilsson, cinematographer and television director
- 27 September – Sigurður Jónsson, footballer
- 12 October – Hanna Birna Kristjánsdóttir, politician.
- 3 December – Ólöf Nordal, politician
