= 1967 in Iceland =

- Decades: 1940s; 1950s; 1960s; 1970s; 1980s
- See also: Other events of 1967; Timeline of Icelandic history

The following lists events that happened in 1967 in Iceland.

== Incumbents ==
- President – Ásgeir Ásgeirsson
- Prime Minister – Bjarni Benediktsson

== Births ==
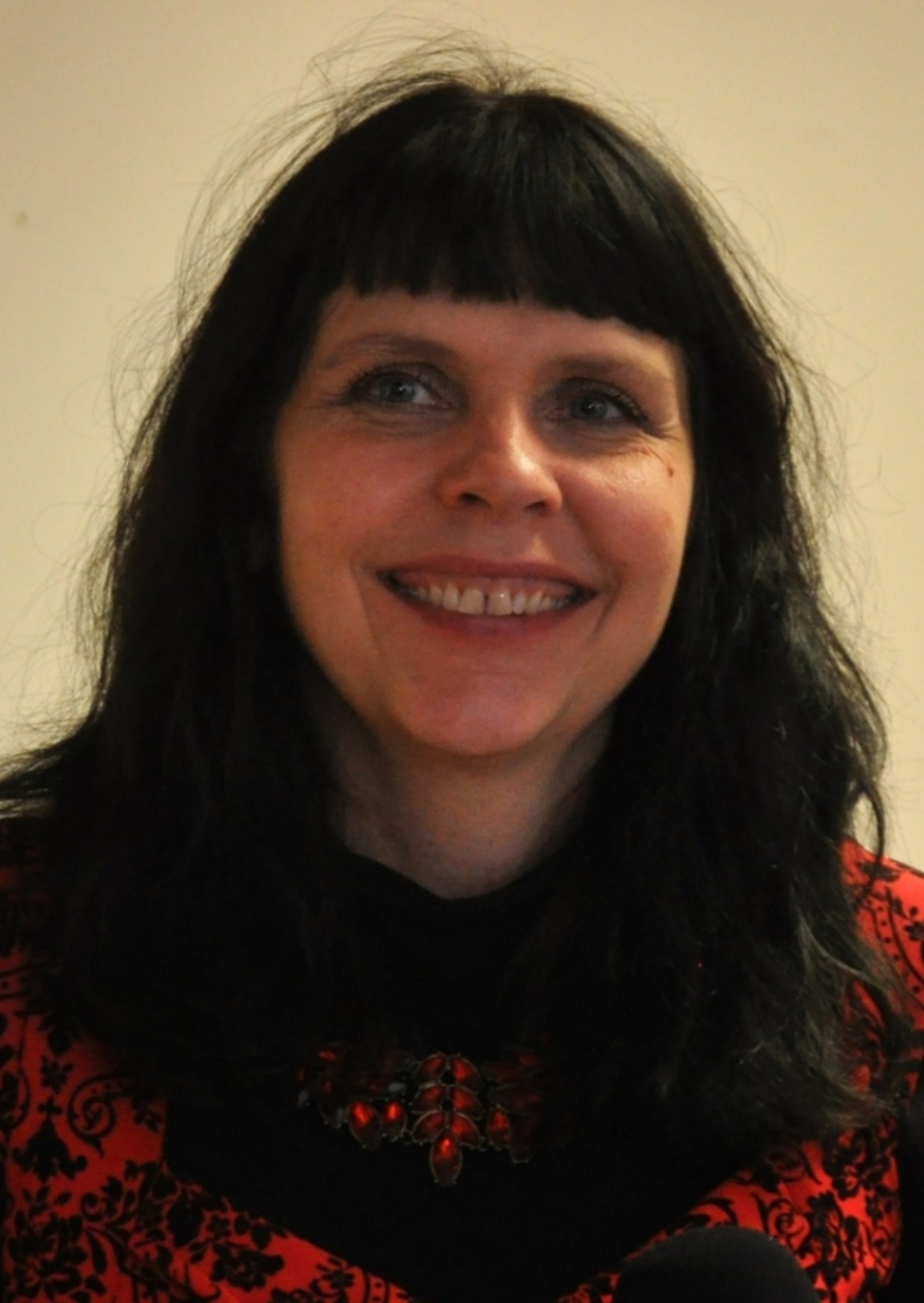
Birgitta Jónsdóttir

- 2 January – Jón Gnarr, actor, comedian and politician
- 19 March – Björgólfur Thor Björgólfsson, businessman
- 17 April – Birgitta Jónsdóttir, politician
- 9 June – Helgi Hjörvar, politician.
- 29 August – Jon Stephenson von Tetzchner, programmer and businessman
