= 1971 in Iceland =

- Decades: 1950s; 1960s; 1970s; 1980s; 1990s
- See also: Other events of 1971; Timeline of Icelandic history

The following lists events that happened in 1971 in Iceland.

== Incumbents ==
- President – Kristján Eldjárn
- Prime Minister – Jóhann Hafstein, Ólafur Jóhannesson

== Events ==
- 21 April – The Codex Regius of the Poetic Edda (Icelandic:Konungsbók Eddukvæða) and the Codex Flateyensis (Icelandic:Flateyjarbók) is returned from Denmark.
- 14 July – Ólafur Jóhannesson succeeds Jóhann Hafstein as the Prime Minister of Iceland, after Hafstein resigns.

== Births ==
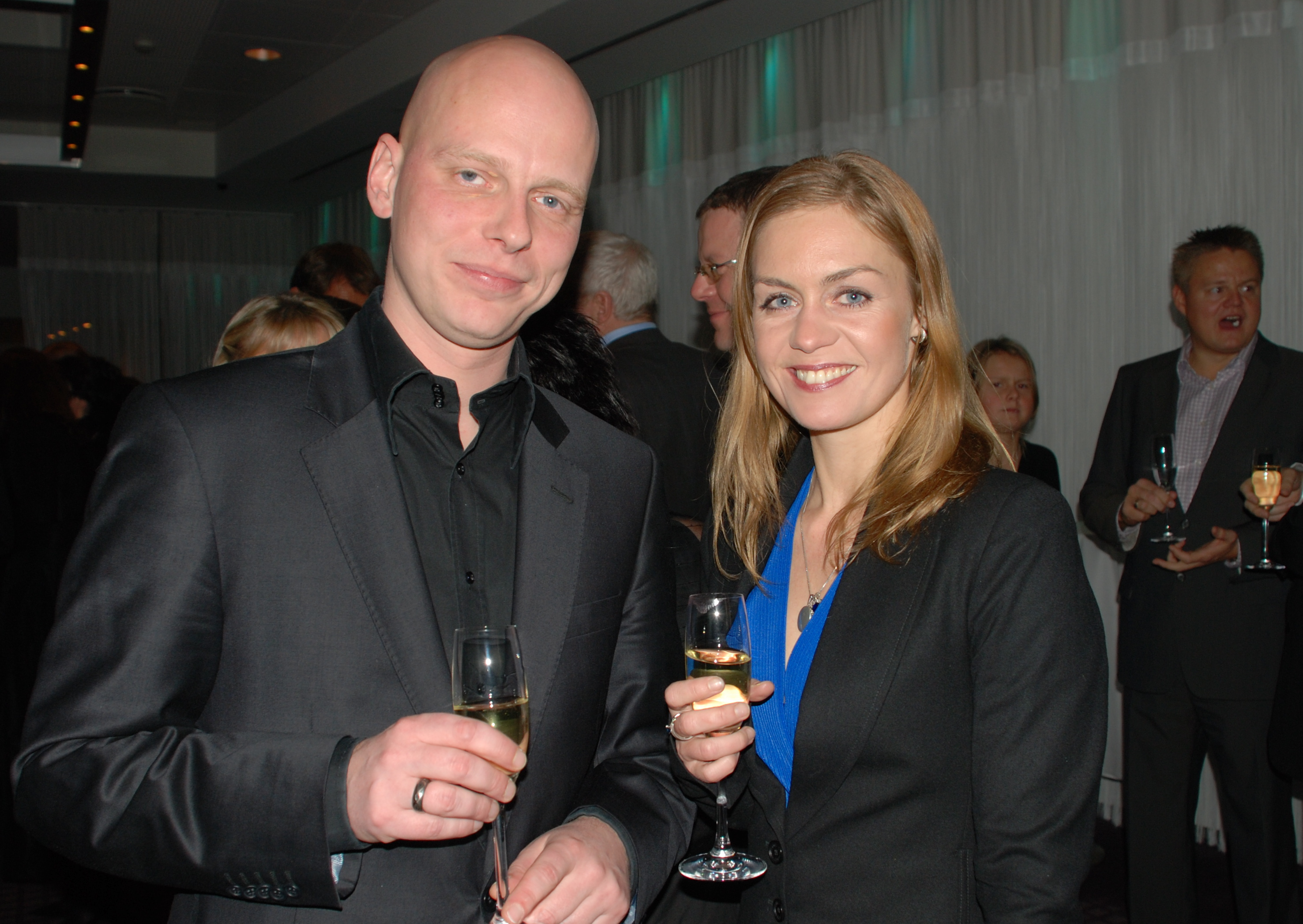
Ragnar Bragason (left)

- 20 June – Thor Kristinsson, singer-songwriter
- 15 September – Ragnar Bragason, film director, screenwriter and producer.

=== Full date missing ===
- Valgeir Sigurðsson, record producer and musician
