= 1957 in Iceland =

- Decades: 1930s; 1940s; 1950s; 1960s; 1970s
- See also: Other events of 1957; Timeline of Icelandic history

The following lists events that happened in 1957 in Iceland.

== Incumbents ==
- President – Ásgeir Ásgeirsson
- Prime Minister – Hermann Jónasson

== Births ==
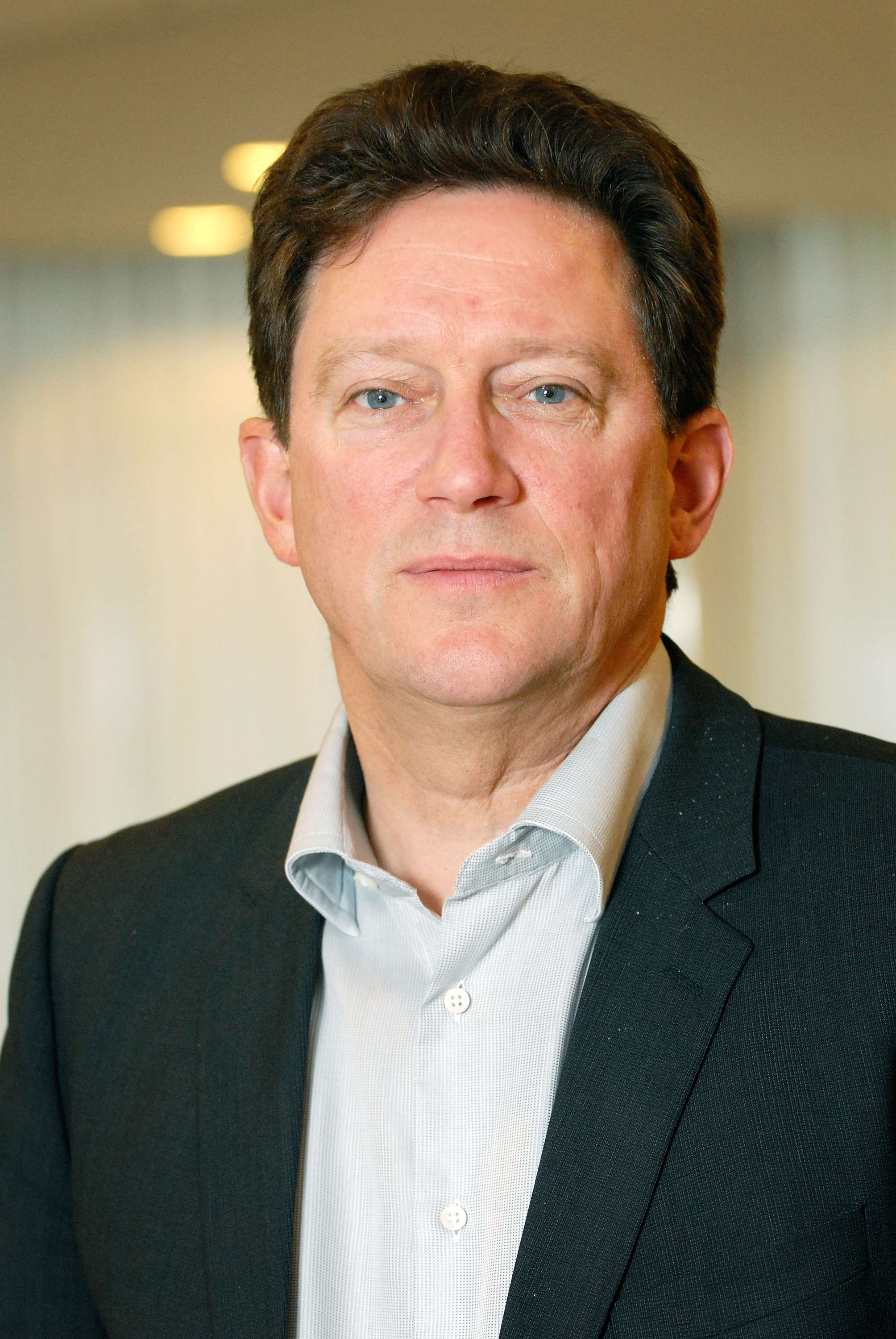
Kristján Þór Júlíusson

- 3 March – Atli Eðvaldsson, footballer (d. 2019)
- 22 March – Þorsteinn Bjarnason, footballer
- 9 April – Oddný Guðbjörg Harðardóttir, politician.
- 24 June – Lilja Rafney Magnúsdóttir, politician.
- 30 June – Ólafur Jóhannesson, footballer
- 15 July – Kristján Þór Júlíusson, politician
- 15 July – Sigurlás Þorleifsson, footballer (d. 2018)

=== Full date missing ===
- Ásgeir Helgason, scientist
