= 1970 in Iceland =

- Decades: 1950s; 1960s; 1970s; 1980s; 1990s
- See also: Other events of 1970; Timeline of Icelandic history

The following lists events that happened in 1970 in Iceland.

== Incumbents ==
- President – Kristján Eldjárn
- Prime Minister – Bjarni Benediktsson, Jóhann Hafstein

== Births ==
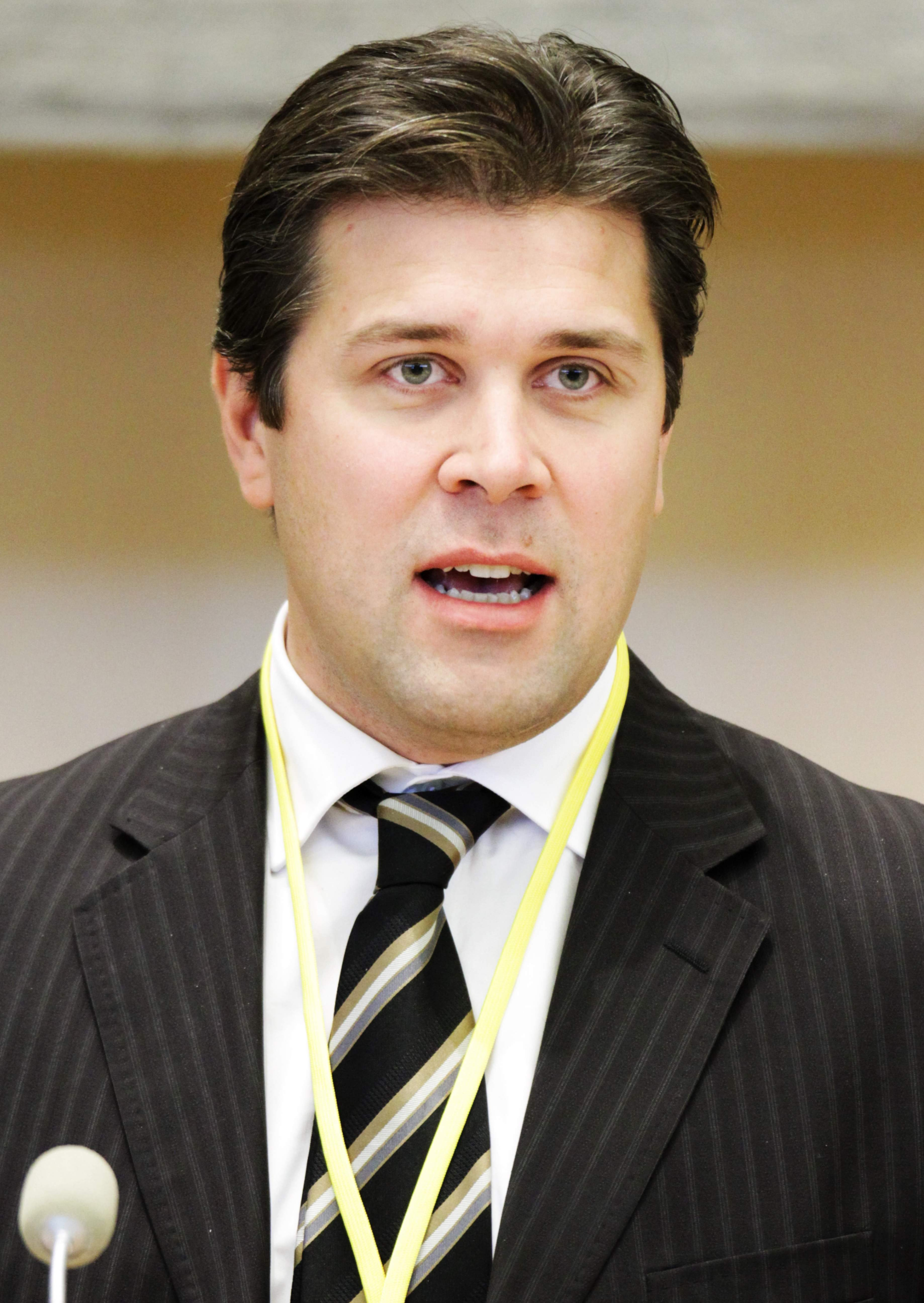
Bjarni Benediktsson

- 26 January – Bjarni Benediktsson, politician
- 16 March – Paul Oscar, pop singer, songwriter and disc jockey.
- Gerður Kristný, writer
- Ármann Jakobsson, Author and scholar.

== Deaths ==
- 10 July – Bjarni Benediktsson, politician (b. 1908)
