= 1955 in Iceland =

- Decades: 1930s; 1940s; 1950s; 1960s; 1970s
- See also: Other events of 1955; Timeline of Icelandic history

The following lists events that happened in 1955 in Iceland.

== Incumbents ==
- President – Ásgeir Ásgeirsson
- Prime Minister – Ólafur Thors

== Events ==
- 21 November – C-47D Skytrain aircraft crash in Akrafjall

== Births ==
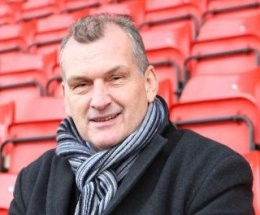
Guðjón Þórðarson

- 10 February – Ólafur Ísleifsson, politician
- 22 March – Guðjón S. Brjánsson, politician
- 20 April – Steinunn Thorarinsdottir, sculptor
- 8 May – Ásgeir Sigurvinsson, footballer
- 17 July – Valgerður Gunnarsdóttir, politician.
- 31 July – Kolbrún Halldórsdóttir, politician
- 4 August – Steingrímur J. Sigfússon, politician
- 14 September – Guðjón Þórðarson, footballer.
- 2 December – Einar Kristinn Guðfinnsson, politician

== Deaths ==
- 29 March – Einar Arnórsson, politician
- 3 May – Sigurjón Pétursson, wrestler
