= 1962 in Iceland =

- Decades: 1940s; 1950s; 1960s; 1970s; 1980s
- See also: Other events of 1962; Timeline of Icelandic history

The following lists events that happened in 1962 in Iceland.

== Incumbents ==
- President – Ásgeir Ásgeirsson
- Prime Minister – Ólafur Thors

== Births ==
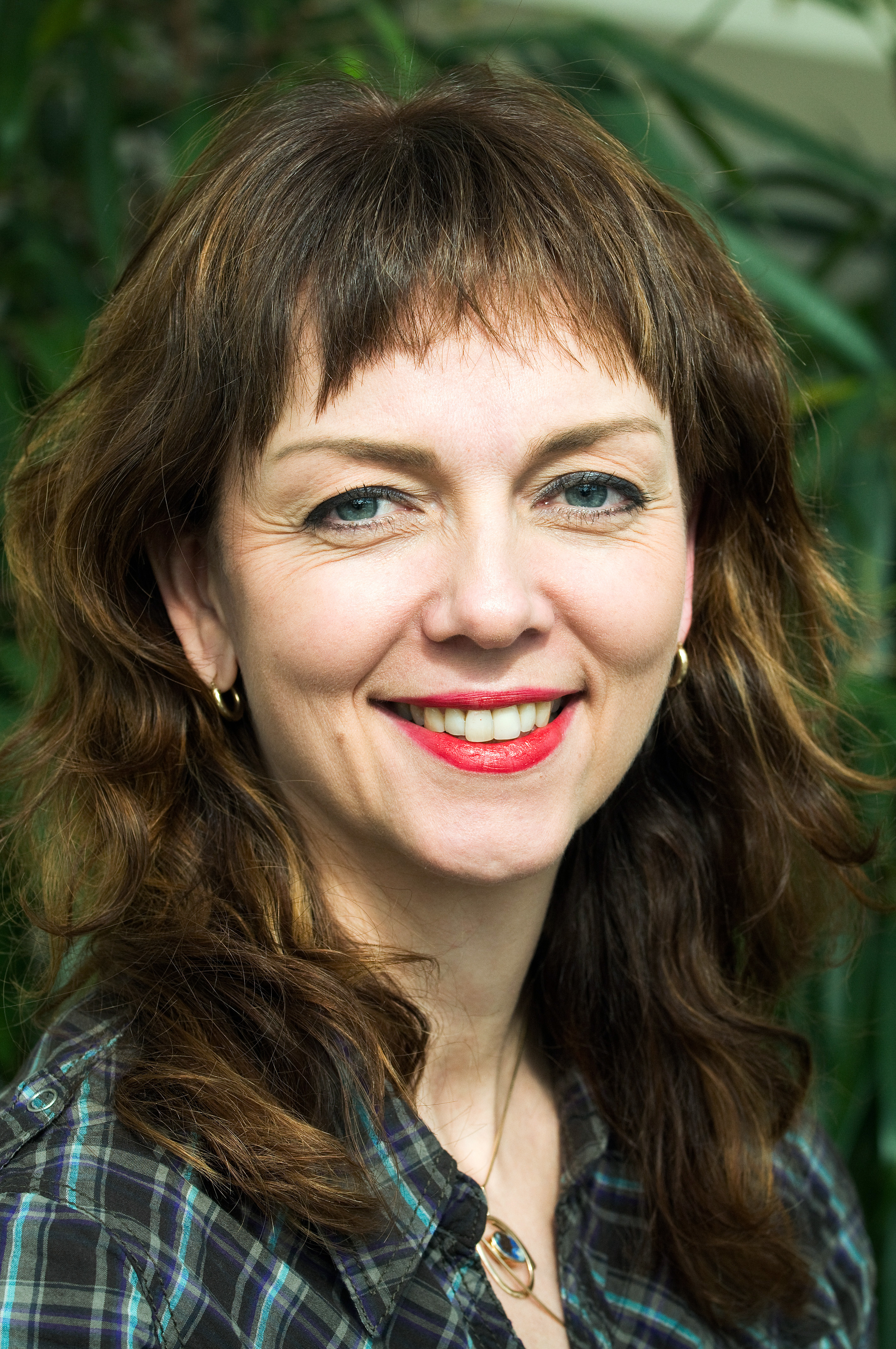
Siv Friðleifsdóttir

- 22 April – Sigurður Ingi Jóhannsson, politician, Prime Minister of Iceland
- 25 June – Kristinn Hrafnsson, journalist
- 24 July – Sigga, singer
- 10 August – Siv Friðleifsdóttir, politician.
- 10 August – Ragna Sigurðardóttir, writer and artist
- 26 September – Ólafur Jóhann Ólafsson, writer
- 2 October – Sigtryggur Baldursson, drummer and singer
- 29 October – Einar Örn Benediktsson, musician

=== Full date missing ===
- Elínborg Halldórsdóttir, musician and painter
