= 1956 in Iceland =

- Decades: 1930s; 1940s; 1950s; 1960s; 1970s
- See also: Other events of 1956; Timeline of Icelandic history

The following lists events that happened in 1956 in Iceland.

== Incumbents ==
- President – Ásgeir Ásgeirsson
- Prime Minister – Ólafur Thors, Hermann Jónasson

== Births ==
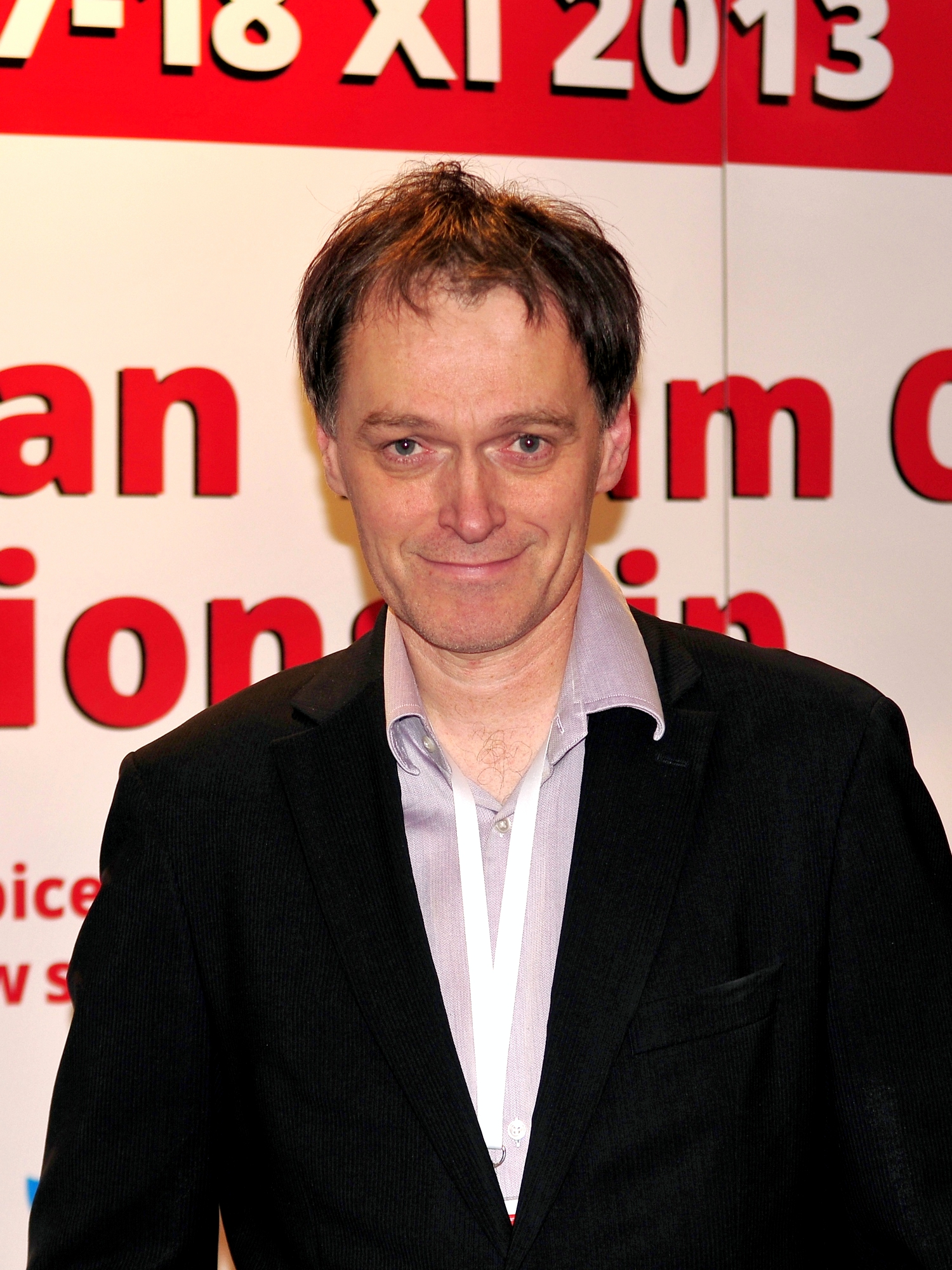
Helgi Ólafsson

- 21 April – Jóhann Sigurðarson, actor and singer
- 16 May – Þorbergur Aðalsteinsson, handball player
- 29 May – Bjarni Friðriksson, judoka
- 06 June - Bubbi Morthens, musician
- 30 July – Árni Sigfússon, politician
- 15 August – Helgi Ólafsson, chess grandmaster
- 27 August – Magnús Bergs, footballer
- 21 September – Jón Gunnarsson, politician.
