= 1741 in Iceland =

- Decades: 1740s; 1750s; 1760s
- See also: Other events in 1741 · Timeline of Icelandic history

Events in the year 1741 in Iceland.

== Incumbents ==
- Monarch: Christian VI
- Governor of Iceland: Henrik Ochsen

== Events ==
- Ludvig Harboe, began a four-year stay (1741–1745) to monitor and support religious and social changes in Iceland.
