= 1750 in Iceland =

- Decades: 1740s; 1750s; 1760s; 1770s
- See also: Other events in 1750 · Timeline of Icelandic history

Events in the year 1750 in Iceland.

== Incumbents ==
- Monarch: Frederick V
- Governor of Iceland: Henrik Ochsen (until 9 September); Otto von Rantzau onwards

== Events ==
- June 20: Eggert Ólafsson and Bjarni Pálsson are recorded as the first people to climb of Hekla.
- September 9: Otto von Rantzau replaces Henrik Ochsen as Governor of Iceland due to Ochsen's death in Denmark.
