= 1959 in Iceland =

- Decades: 1930s; 1940s; 1950s; 1960s; 1970s
- See also: Other events of 1959; Timeline of Icelandic history

The following lists events that happened in 1959 in Iceland.

== Incumbents ==
- President – Ásgeir Ásgeirsson
- Prime Minister – Emil Jónsson, Ólafur Thors

== Events ==
- Herjólfur I was built
- Sigurbjörn Einarsson became the tenth Bishop of Iceland, succeeding Ásmundur Guðmundsson in the position.

== Births ==
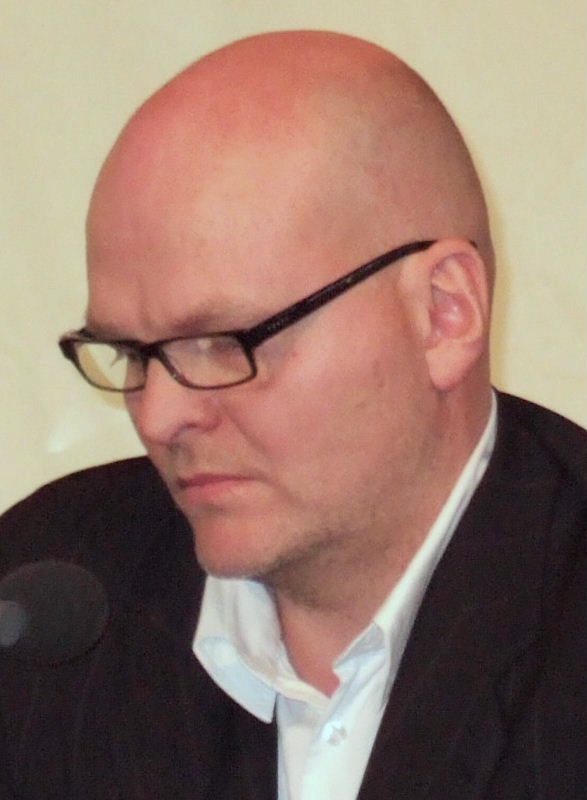
Hallgrímur Helgason

- 1 February – Ómar Torfason, footballer
- 21 April – Lúðvík Geirsson, politician.
- 18 February – Hallgrímur Helgason, painter, novelist, translator, and columnist
- 19 June – Örn Árnason, actor, comedian and screenwriter
- 27 June – Pétur Pétursson, footballer
- 4 July – Eiríkur Hauksson, heavy metal vocalist
- 7 September – Alfreð Gíslason, handball player and coach

=== Full date missing ===
- Elsa Waage, opera singer

== Deaths ==
=== Full date missing ===
- Kristín Jónsdóttir, painter (b. 1888)
