= 1960 in Iceland =

- Decades: 1940s; 1950s; 1960s; 1970s; 1980s
- See also: Other events of 1960; Timeline of Icelandic history

The following lists events that happened in 1960 in Iceland.

== Incumbents ==
- President – Ásgeir Ásgeirsson
- Prime Minister – Ólafur Thors

== Events ==
- 11 March 1961 - The Icelandic Althing approved the agreement which expands its territorial waters to 12 nmi (22 km), following the first stage of the territorial dispute with the United Kingdom known as the Cod Wars.

== Births ==
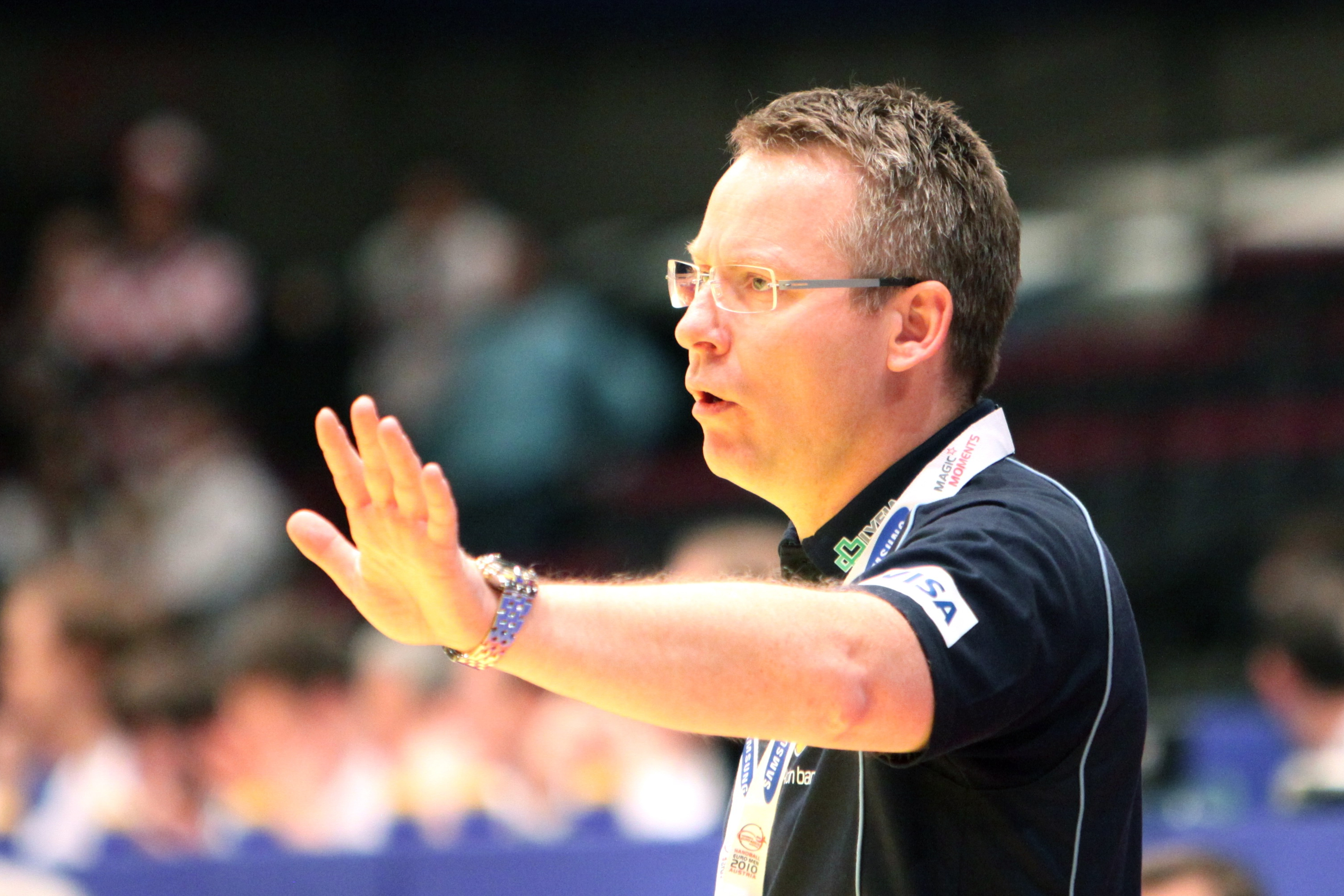
Guðmundur Guðmundsson

- 1 June – Einar Vilhjálmsson, javelin thrower
- 18 July – Guðmundur Steinsson, footballer
- 30 July – Árni Þór Sigurðsson, ambassador
- 4 September – Elín Hirst, politician.
- 8 October – Bryndís Hlöðversdóttir, politician
- 16 October – Bjarni Sigurðsson, footballer
- 13 November – Jón Loftur Árnason, chess grandmaster
- 8 December – Broddi Kristjansson, badminton player
- 8 December – Sólveig Anspach, film director and screenwriter (d. 2015)
- 23 December – Guðmundur Guðmundsson, handball player
