= 1958 in Iceland =

- Decades: 1930s; 1940s; 1950s; 1960s; 1970s
- See also: Other events of 1958; Timeline of Icelandic history

The following lists events that happened in 1958 in Iceland.

== Incumbents ==
- President – Ásgeir Ásgeirsson
- Prime Minister – Hermann Jónasson, Emil Jónsson

== Births ==
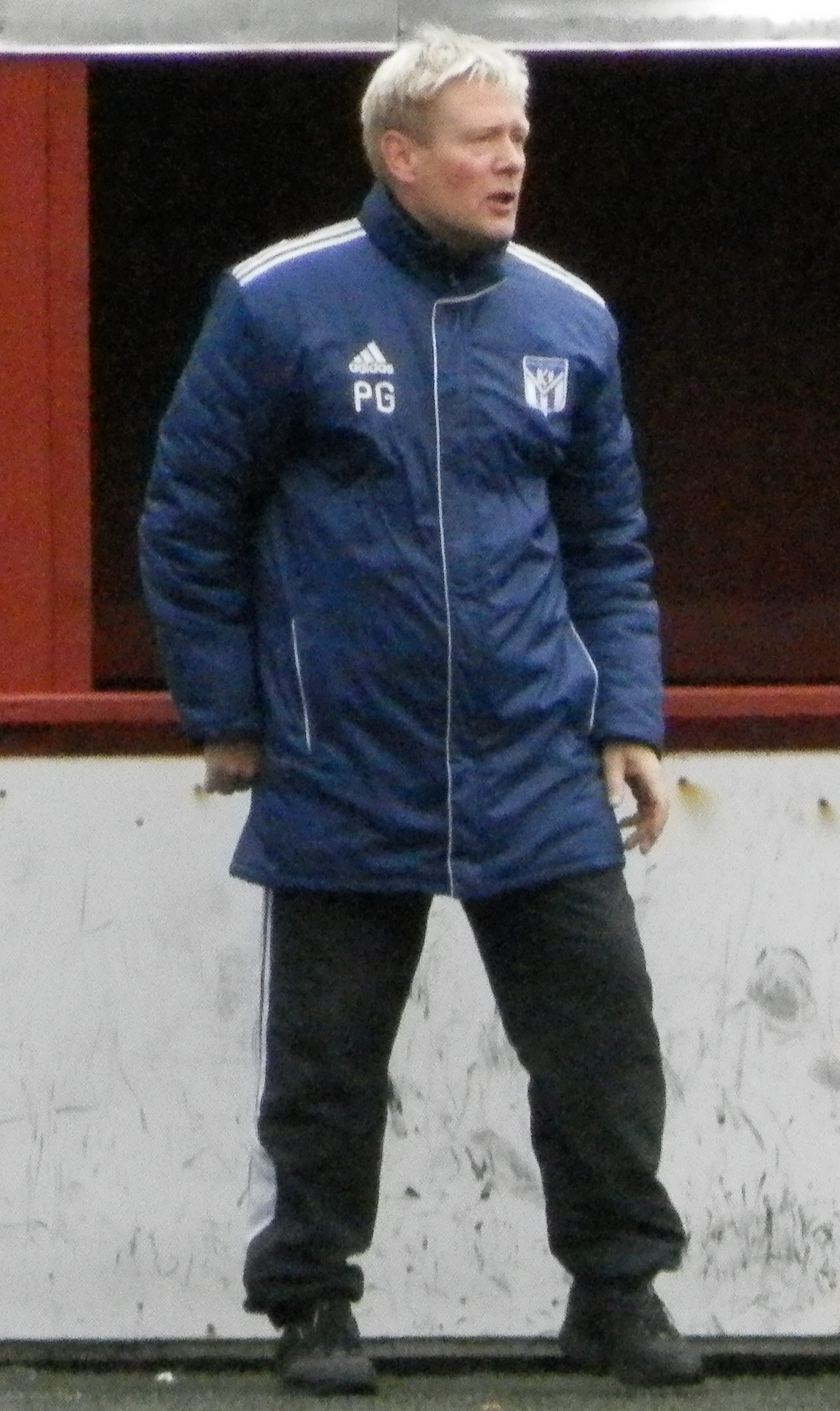
Páll Guðlaugsson

- 23 April – Hilmar Örn Hilmarsson, musician and art director
- 23 June – Sigurður Páll Jónsson, politician
- 27 June – Jón Steindór Valdimarsson, politician
- 22 July – Sævar Jónsson, footballer
- 28 July – Pétur Ormslev, footballer
- 30 August – Sigrún Edda Björnsdóttir, actress and writer
- 8 September – Ólína Þorvarðardóttir, politician.
- 9 September – Páll Guðlaugsson, footballer

=== Full date missing ===
- Ragnar Th. Sigurdsson, photographer

== Deaths ==
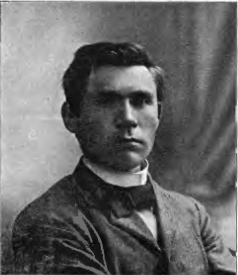
Ásgrímur Jónsson

- 5 April – Ásgrímur Jónsson, painter (b. 1876)
