= 1954 in Iceland =

- Decades: 1930s; 1940s; 1950s; 1960s; 1970s
- See also: Other events of 1954; Timeline of Icelandic history

The following lists events that happened in 1954 in Iceland.

== Incumbents ==
- President – Ásgeir Ásgeirsson
- Prime Minister – Ólafur Thors

== Events ==
- Gígjökull glacier advances 328 m since the Mount Hekla eruption 7 years prior.
- Ásmundur Guðmundsson became the ninth Bishop of Iceland, following the death of Sigurgeir Sigurðsson the previous year.

== Births ==
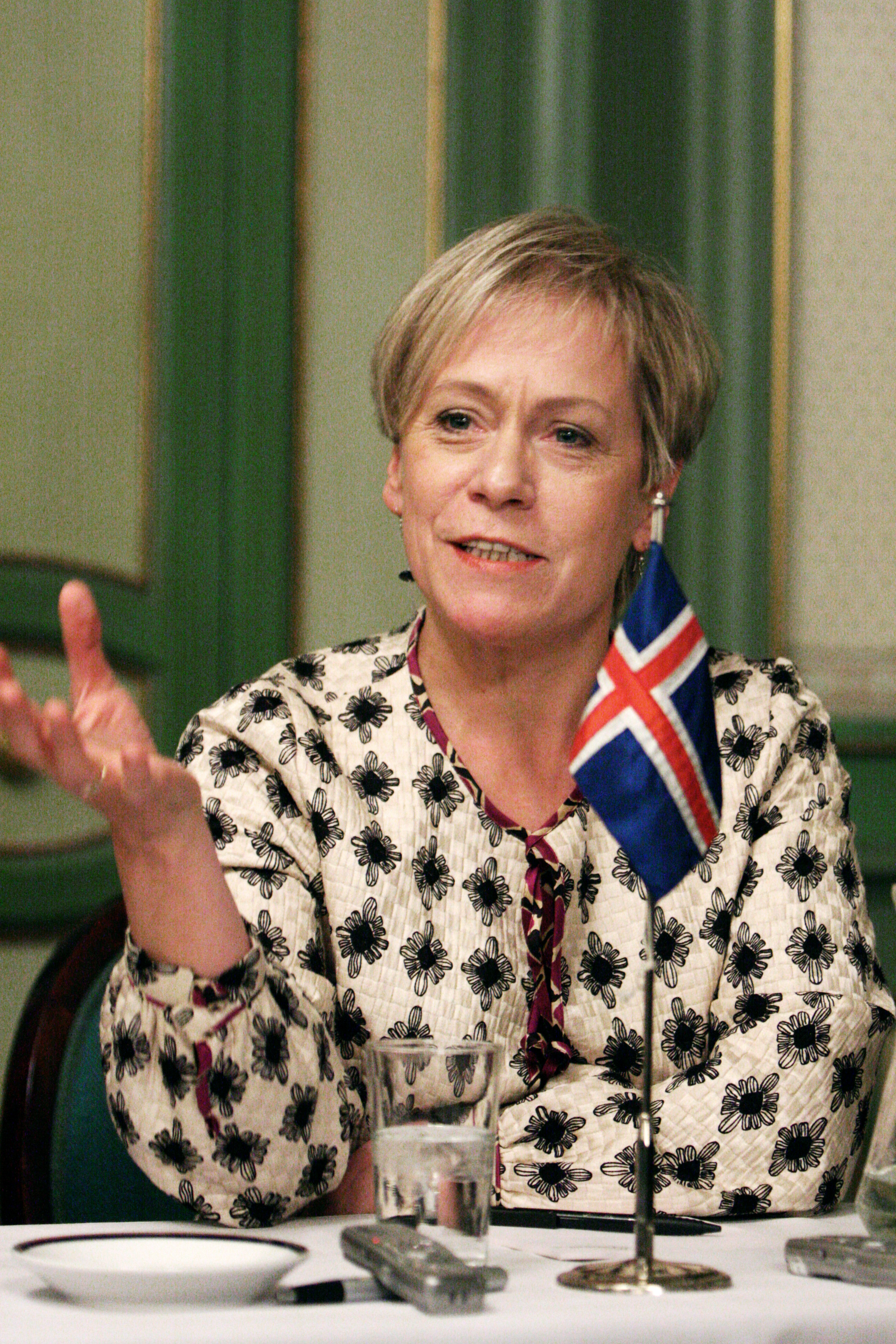
Ingibjörg Sólrún Gísladóttir

- 23 January – Guðný Halldórsdóttir, film director and screenwriter
- 12 May – Friðrik Þór Friðriksson, film director
- 29 May - Margrét Frímannsdóttir, politician
- 18 June – Tinna Gunnlaugsdóttir, actress
- 8 August – Finnur Ingólfsson, politician.
- 18 September – Einar Már Guðmundsson, poet and novelist
- 11 December – Guðlaugur Kristinn Óttarsson, musician
- 31 December – Ingibjörg Sólrún Gísladóttir, politician

== Deaths ==
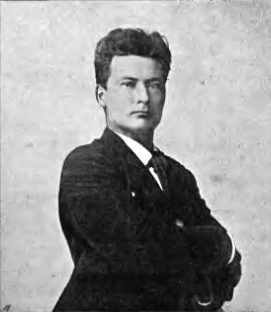
Einar Jónsson

- 18 October – Einar Jónsson, sculptor (b. 1874)
