= Þorleifur Skaftason =

Icelandic priest and Galdrmaster

Þorleifur Skaftason (1683–1748), was an Icelandic priest and Galdrmaster. He is known in Icelandic folklore, where he is the subject of many folk sagas about his alleged magical performances.
