= 1972 in Iceland =

- Decades: 1950s; 1960s; 1970s; 1980s; 1990s
- See also: Other events of 1972; Timeline of Icelandic history

The following lists events that happened in 1972 in Iceland.

== Incumbents ==
- President – Kristján Eldjárn
- Prime Minister – Ólafur Jóhannesson

== Events ==
- Worship of Norse gods is revived and officially approved.

== Births ==
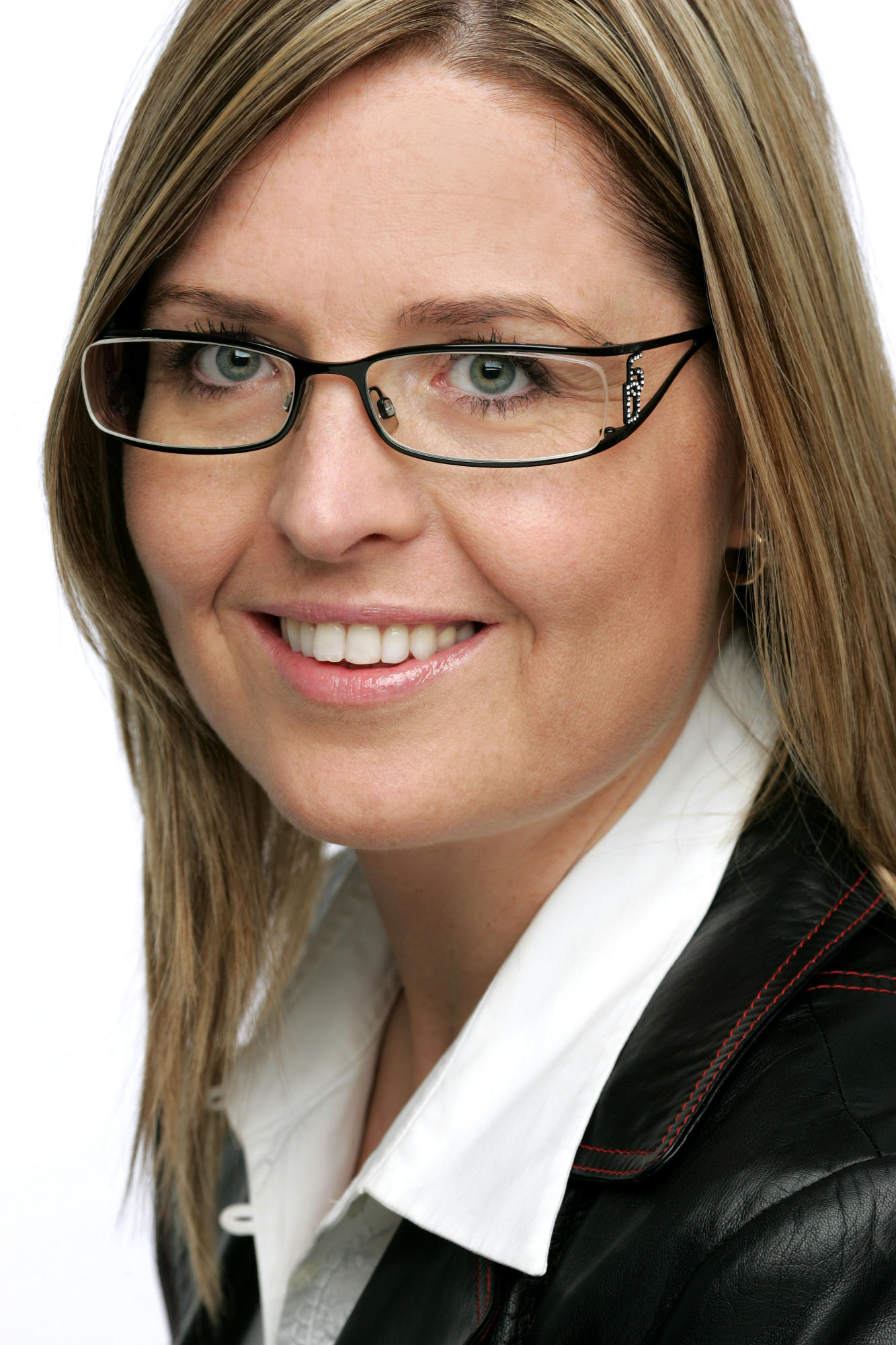
Steinunn Kristín Þórðardóttir

- 17 January – Stefán Vagn Stefánsson, politician
- 29 March – Hera Björk, singer
- 9 April – Steinunn Kristín Þórðardóttir, businesswoman
- 18 July – Hannes Stefánsson, chess Grandmaster
- 22 August – Þórarinn Ingi Pétursson, politician
- 28 October – Guðmundur Steingrímsson, politician.
- 12 December – Eygló Harðardóttir, politician
- 29 December – Reynir Grétarsson, businessman
