= 1751 in Iceland =

- Decades: 1740s; 1750s; 1760s; 1770s
- See also: Other events in 1751 · Timeline of Icelandic history

Events in the year 1751 in Iceland.

== Incumbents ==
- Monarch: Frederick V
- Governor of Iceland: Otto von Rantzau

== Events ==
- July 17: Inredningarin, a company for the promotion of industry in Iceland, is founded at Þingvellir.
