= Gunnar Gíslason =

Icelandic footballer

Personal information
- Full name: Gunnar Gíslason
- Date of birth: 4 January 1961 (age 65)
- Place of birth: Akureyri, Iceland
- Position: Defender

Senior career*
Years	Team	Apps	(Gls)
1977–1983	KA Akureyri	72	(11)
1983–1984	VfL Osnabrück	5	(1)
1984–1986	KR Reykjavik	52	(7)
1987–1988	Moss F.K.	44	(3)
1989–1991	BK Häcken	34	(5)
1992	KR Reykjavik	15	(1)
1993	BK Häcken	16	(1)
Total		238	(29)

International career
1982–1991	Iceland	50	(3)
- * Club domestic league appearances and goals

Gunnar Gíslason (born 4 January 1961) is an Icelandic former footballer who played as a defender.Gunnar also played handboll in Iceland at highest level.

== Club career ==
Gíslason started his career at KA Akureyri before moving abroad to play in Germany, Norway and Sweden, where he finished his career at BK Häcken. Gunnar played handball at KA Akureyri and KR Reykjavik. Gunnar won the Icelandic cup in handboll with KR Reykjavik 1982.

== International career ==
Gíslason made his debut for Iceland in 1982 and went on to collect 50 caps, scoring three goals. He played his last international match in a June 1991 European Championship qualifying match against Czechoslovakia. Gislason has even played handball for Iceland.He played 12 caps in the early 80´s along with his brother Alfred Gislason.
