= Þórhallur Gunnarsson =

Icelandic actor and television personality

- Born: November 11, 1963 (age 61)
- Occupation: Head of TV productions at Sagafilm

Þórhallur Gunnarsson (born November 11, 1963) is an Icelandic actor and television personality. Þórhallur has a B.A. degree in acting from the Iceland Academy of the Arts and an M.A. degree in television journalism from Goldsmiths, University of London. He was employed on a permanent basis at Borgarleikhúsið theater in Reykjavík from 1996 to 2000 and has worked for RÚV radio, and the Icelandic television channels Sjónvarpið, Skjár einn, and Stöð 2. Þórhallur was head of television of RÚV, as well as serving as the editor and host of Sjónvarpið's highly rated news/talk show Kastljós. Additionally, he has taught acting and engaged in work as a director. He is currently the head of TV productions at the Icelandic production company Syn
