= 1742 in Iceland =

- Decades: 1740s; 1750s; 1760s
- See also: Other events in 1742 · Timeline of Icelandic history

Events in the year 1742 in Iceland.

== Incumbents ==
- Monarch: Christian VI
- Governor of Iceland: Henrik Ochsen

== Events ==
- 30 March: Sveinn Sölvason became deputy attorney general for the north and west of the country.

== Deaths ==
- 24 July: Nikulás Magnússon, sheriff of Rangárvallasýsla, drowned in Flosagjá.
