= Thor Kristinsson =

- Birth name: Þór Breiðfjörð Kristinsson
- Also known as: Thor Kristinsson
- Born: 20 June 1971 (age 53)
- Origin: Iceland
- Genres: Rock
- Occupation: Singer-songwriter
- Years active: 1997–present
- Labels: Independent
- Website: thorthemusic.com

Þór Breiðfjörð Kristinsson (born 20 June 1971), also simply known as Thor Kristinsson, is an Icelandic-born singer-songwriter with a background in musical theatre. He has starred in several musical productions both in the UK and in Iceland. In 2008 he released his debut album, Running Naked.

== Career ==
Thor Kristinsson started his career playing in cafés and bars in Reykjavík in the late eighties and early nineties before moving on to songwriting and session singing. His debut within the theatre was in the musical Hair in 1994 in and in 1995 he took on the role of Judas in the rock opera Jesus Christ Superstar.

In 1996 Thor moved to London where he studied Musical Theatre at Arts Educational Schools, London. After his graduation, Thor starred in Jesus Christ Superstar on West End and later in Les Misérables where he played a few of the major roles. On a tour around the UK Thor had the chance to play the role of Jean Valjean himself when he was understudying Colm Wilkinson in his comeback in Dublin to the role that made him famous. In 2000 Thor created the part of Jehovah in the new musical Roll Over Jehovah at the New End Theatre in Hampstead and toured the United Kingdom in 2001 playing The Phantom in Ken Hill's Phantom of the Opera. In 2004 Thor appeared at the London Playhouse as the jilted lover Count Paris, in a version of Shakespeare's Romeo and Juliet, sharing the stage with stars such as Derek Jacobi, Timothy Dalton, Joanna Lumley and Dawn French.

Thor has also made various appearances on Icelandic national television and radio both as a solo artist and with the band Zalka. He has appeared in several music videos and films as well as one episode of the BBC TV series All Along the Watchtower.

In 2008 Thor released his debut solo album Running Naked with multi-award winning Canadian producer Fred Lavery. The album was made in Atlantic canada and received a nomination at the East Coast Music Awards in 2010. Thor was selected to play at the awards.

In 2009 Thor was chosen by Microsoft to participate in a campaign in collaboration with ReverbNation where 1000 artists, including established indie-bands such as The Lemonheads and Warren G, could offer their fans a free download of one of their songs, compensated by Microsoft. Thor's single "Sunny Day" was downloaded nearly 2600 times during the three months that the campaign lasted and landed in the top 80 of these 1000 songs.

== Discography ==
- Running Naked (2008)
