= 1747 in Iceland =

- Decades: 1740s; 1750s; 1760s
- See also: Other events in 1747 · Timeline of Icelandic history

Events in the year 1747 in Iceland.

== Incumbents ==
- Monarch: Frederick V
- Governor of Iceland: Henrik Ochsen

== Events ==
- The Housing Discipline Directive, which was a decree by former King Christian VI, on the arrangements for upbringing, education and religious life, is published in parliament.
