= 1743 in Iceland =

- Decades: 1740s; 1750s; 1760s
- See also: Other events in 1743 · Timeline of Icelandic history

Events in the year 1743 in Iceland.

== Incumbents ==
- Monarch: Christian VI
- Governor of Iceland: Henrik Ochsen

== Events ==
- 14 February: Finnur Jónsson is appointed official of the Diocese of Skálholt, serving as bishop until a new bishop has been elected after the death of Jón Árnason.
