= 1749 in Iceland =

- Decades: 1740s; 1750s; 1760s
- See also: Other events in 1749 · Timeline of Icelandic history

Events in the year 1749 in Iceland.

== Incumbents ==
- Monarch: Frederick V
- Governor of Iceland: Henrik Ochsen

== Events ==
- Sheriff Kristján Drese dismissed due to drunkenness and disorder.
- An earthquake occurred in Southern Iceland.
