= 1748 in Iceland =

- Decades: 1740s; 1750s; 1760s
- See also: Other events in 1748 · Timeline of Icelandic history

Events in the year 1748 in Iceland.

== Incumbents ==
- Monarch: Frederick V
- Governor of Iceland: Henrik Ochsen

== Deaths ==
- Þorleifur Skaftason – Priest and Galdrmaster (b. 1683)
