= Elsa Waage =

Icelandic contralto opera singer (born 1959)

- Born: 1959 (age 65–66)
- Genres: Opera
- Occupation: Contralto singer

Elsa Waage is an Icelandic contralto opera singer. She was born in Reykjavík 1959, the second child of parents Steinar Waage, orthopedic shoe maker, and Clara Grimmer Waage.

== Life ==
She studied music and voice training in the Reykjavík Conservatory. She later studied and specialized in Germany and Netherlands and got her bachelor degree of music in the United States, Washington Catholic University of America. Waage lived in New York for some years, where she became a member of the New Jersey Opera Institute. She moved to Italy, where she married Emilio De Rossi. She is still very active in both opera and concerts. Waage is best known for her stage personality and intense artistic interpretation. Her roles include Maddalena in Verdi's Rigoletto and Erda in Wagner's Das Rheingold and Siegfried.

Her repertoire also includes sacred music such as Verdi's Requiem and Rossini's Petite Messe Solennelle. She has performed in opera houses in Mexico, Germany, Italy, Switzerland, Iceland, USA, Austria, Denmark, Sweden,

Elsa has received the following awards:

- American Sibelius Award,
- American Scandinavian Association Award
