= 1744 in Iceland =

- Decades: 1740s; 1750s; 1760s
- See also: Other events in 1744 · Timeline of Icelandic history

Events in the year 1744 in Iceland.

== Incumbents ==
- Monarch: Christian VI
- Governor of Iceland: Henrik Ochsen

== Events ==
- Ludvig Harboe became bishop of Skálholt.
