= Bjarni Benediktsson (born 1908) =

Prime Minister of Iceland from 1963 to 1970

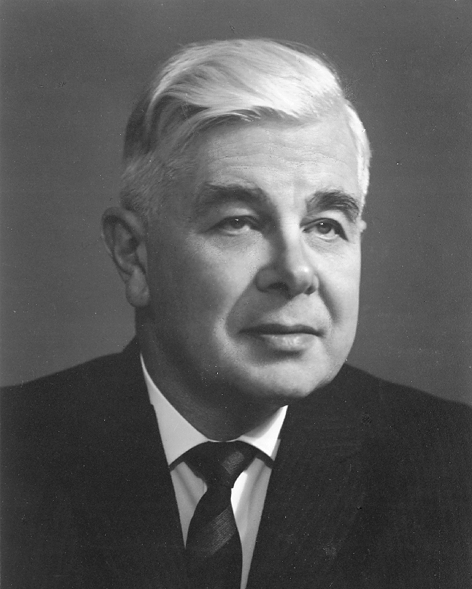

17th Prime Minister of Iceland
- In office 14 November 1963 – 10 July 1970
- President: Ásgeir Ásgeirsson; Kristján Eldjárn
- Preceded by: Ólafur Thors
- Succeeded by: Jóhann Hafstein
- Acting; 8 September 1961 – 31 December 1961
- President: Ásgeir Ásgeirsson
- Preceded by: Ólafur Thors
- Succeeded by: Ólafur Thors

Minister for Foreign Affairs
- In office 4 February 1947 – 11 September 1953
- Prime Minister: Stefán Jóhann Stefánsson; Ólafur Thors; Steingrímur Steinþórsson
- Preceded by: Ólafur Thors
- Succeeded by: Kristinn Guðmundsson

Personal details
- Born: 30 April 1908 Reykjavík, Iceland
- Died: 10 July 1970 (aged 62) Þingvellir, Iceland
- Party: Independence
- Education: University of Iceland

Bjarni Benediktsson (Icelandic pronunciation: [ˈpja(r)tnɪ ˈpɛːnɛtɪxtsˌsɔːn]; 30 April 1908 – 10 July 1970) was an Icelandic politician of the Independence Party who served as prime minister of Iceland from 1963 to 1970. He was born to Benedikt Sveinsson (1877–1954), a leader in the independence movement of Iceland and a member of the Althingi from 1908 to 1931, and Guðrún Pétursdóttir frá Engey, a nationally renowned poet.

Bjarni studied constitutional law and became a professor at the University of Iceland at age 24. He was elected to the city council in Reykjavík in 1934 as a member of the Independence Party and from 1940 to 1947 was mayor of the city.

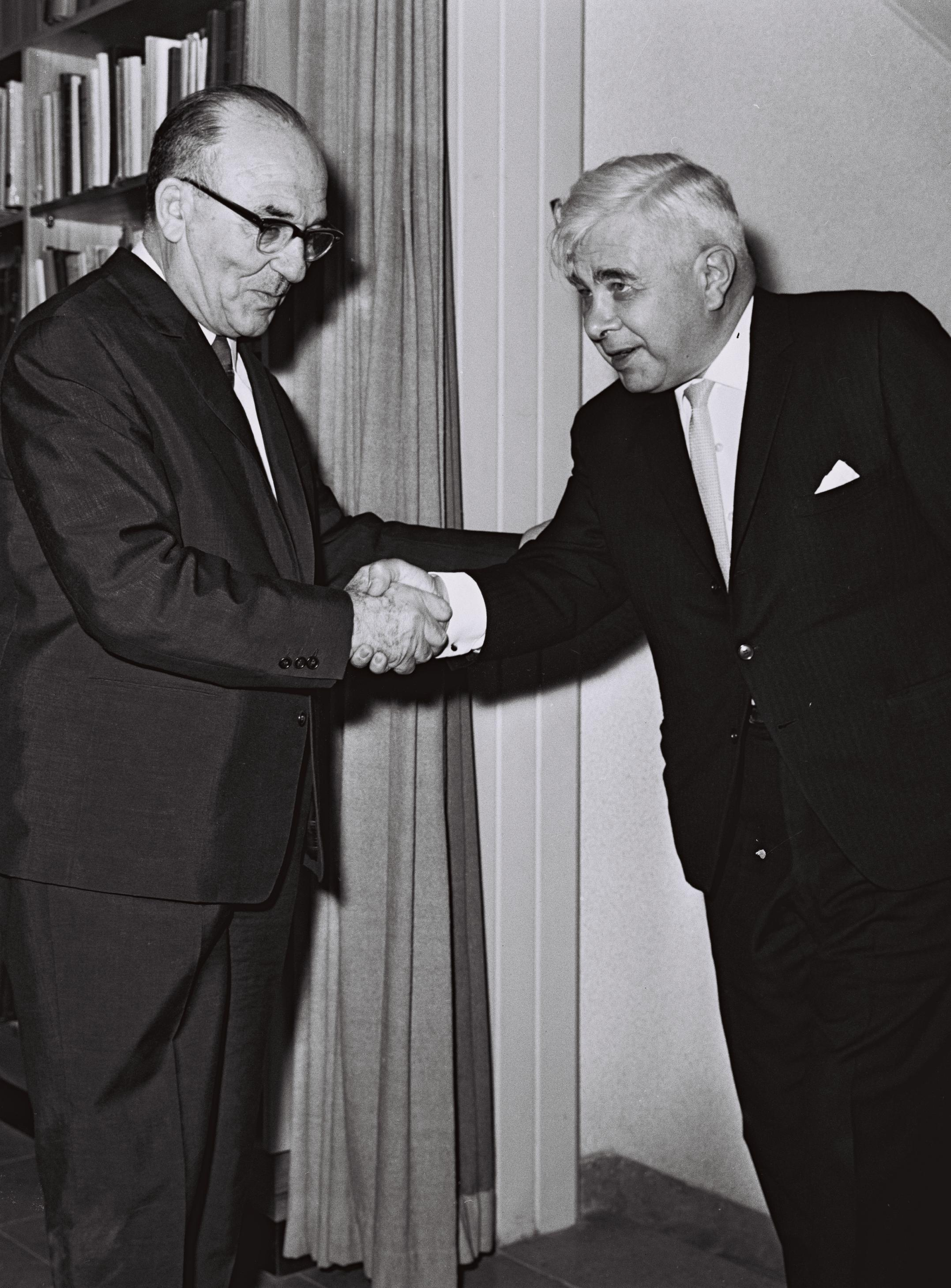
Bjarni (right) with Prime Minister of Israel Levi Eshkol in 1964.

In 1947 he became Foreign Minister and served in various posts in cabinets until 1956. Bjarni was mainly responsible for Iceland joining NATO in 1949, against significant opposition, and for giving the United States Air Force a lease on Keflavík Airport near Reykjavík, which was of major strategic importance during the Cold War. Bjarni was caricatured by the Nobel prize winning writer Halldór Laxness in his 1948 play Atómstöðin (The Atom Station).

In 1956, when the left-wing parties formed a coalition government, Bjarni, out of office, became editor of Morgunblaðið, a leading conservative newspaper. In 1959, when the Independence Party formed a coalition government with the Social Democrats, Bjarni became Minister of Justice. He served as speaker of the Althing in 1959. Two years later he was elected chairman of the Independence Party and in 1963 he took over from Ólafur Thors as Prime Minister. When Bjarni became prime minister, he received a congratulatory letter from the president of the United States, John F. Kennedy, only six days before his assassination. Bjarni served in this position until his death, which was caused by a fire at a government summer house at Þingvellir on 10 July 1970. His wife and their 4-year-old grandson also perished in the blaze. Jóhann Hafstein was made prime minister immediately following his death.

Bjarni was the father of politicians Björn Bjarnason and Valgerður Bjarnadóttir, as well as the father-in-law of Vilmundur Gylfason. Bjarni was the great-uncle of his namesake Bjarni Benediktsson, who became Prime Minister in January 2017.

Political offices
Preceded by Ólafur Thors	Minister for Foreign Affairs; 1947–1953	Succeeded by Kristinn Guðmundsson
Preceded by Ólafur Thors	Prime Minister of Iceland; 1963–1970	Succeeded by Jóhann Hafstein
Party political offices
Preceded by Ólafur Thors	Leader of the Independence Party; 1963–1970	Succeeded by Jóhann Hafstein
