= Henrik Ochsen =

Danish civil servant (1660–1750)

Henrik Ochsen (26 April 1660 – 9 September 1750) was a Danish civil servant.

== Life and Career ==
Ochsen was born 26 April 1660, the son of a silk and textile merchant Thomas Ocksen, and his wife Elisabeth Thofall. He became treasurer (zahlkasserer) in the Ministry of Finance in 1692 and in 1712 he became head of the government department in the ministry, but was removed in 1716 and did not hold any other official office until he was made governor of Iceland and the Faroe Islands on 11 December 1730. He held the position until his death, but travelled neither to Iceland or the Faroe Islands.

He died 9 September 1750.
