= 1812 in Iceland =

- Decades: 1790s; 1800s; 1810s; 1820s; 1830s
- See also: Other events in 1812 · Timeline of Icelandic history

Events in the year 1812 in Iceland.

== Incumbents ==
- Monarch: Frederick VI
- Governors of Iceland: Johan Carl Thuerecht von Castenschiold, Stefán Þórarinsson, Ísleifur Einarsson and Rasmus Frydensberg

== Events ==
- Fines for having children out of wedlock are abolished. The fines had been in place since the Stóridómur was passed in 1564.

== Births ==
- Kristín Bjarnadóttir, politician.
- 17 February: Pétur Havsteen, politician.
- 13 November: Páll Melsteð, historian and politician.
