= 1811 in Iceland =

- Decades: 1790s; 1800s; 1810s; 1820s; 1830s
- See also: Other events in 1811 · Timeline of Icelandic history

Events in the year 1811 in Iceland.

== Incumbents ==
- Monarch: Frederick VI
- Governors of Iceland: Johan Carl Thuerecht von Castenschiold, Stefán Þórarinsson, Ísleifur Einarsson and Rasmus Frydensberg

== Events ==
- Rasmus Rask publishes his first book, Introduction to the Icelandic or Old Norse Language, which he published in Danish.

== Births ==
- Jón Sigurðsson, leader of the Icelandic independence movement.
