= 1810 in Iceland =

- Decades: 1790s; 1800s; 1810s; 1820s; 1830s
- See also: Other events in 1810 · Timeline of Icelandic history

Events in the year 1810 in Iceland.

== Incumbents ==
- Monarch: Frederick VI
- Governors of Iceland: Frederik Christopher Trampe

== Events ==
- Frederik Christopher Trampe is replaced as Governor of Iceland by Ísleifur Einarsson, Johan Carl Thuerecht von Castenschiold, Rasmus Frydensberg and Stefán Þórarinsson.

== Births ==
- 15 April: Brynjólfur Pétursson, lawyer and government official
