= 1814 in Iceland =

- Decades: 1790s; 1800s; 1810s; 1820s; 1830s
- See also: Other events in 1814 · Timeline of Icelandic history

Events in the year 1814 in Iceland.

== Incumbents ==
- Monarch: Frederick VI
- Governor of Iceland: Johan Carl Thuerecht von Castenschiold

== Events ==
- Johan Carl Thuerecht von Castenschiold takes over as sole Governor of Iceland, after he jointly held the position alongside Stefán Þórarinsson, Ísleifur Einarsson and Rasmus Frydensberg.
- The first Icelandic police officer, Jón Benjamínsson, took office.
- Frederick VI ceded Norway to King Charles XIII of Sweden, and the Danish-Norwegian union came to an end, formally ending Norwegian possession of Iceland.
