= 1813 in Iceland =

- Decades: 1790s; 1800s; 1810s; 1820s; 1830s
- See also: Other events in 1813 · Timeline of Icelandic history

Events in the year 1813 in Iceland.

== Incumbents ==
- Monarch: Frederick VI
- Governors of Iceland: Johan Carl Thuerecht von Castenschiold, Stefán Þórarinsson, Ísleifur Einarsson and Rasmus Frydensberg

== Events ==
- The kingdoms of Denmark and Norway were separated by the Treaty of Kiel in 1814 following the Napoleonic Wars, Denmark kept Iceland, as well as Faroe and Greenland, as dependencies.
