= 1809 in Iceland =

- Decades: 1780s; 1790s; 1800s; 1810s; 1820s
- See also: Other events in 1809 · Timeline of Icelandic history

Events in the year 1809 in Iceland.

== Incumbents ==
- Monarch: Frederick VI
- Governors of Iceland: Frederik Christopher Trampe
- Self Proclaimed Protector of Iceland: Jørgen Jørgensen (26 June 1809 – 22 August 1809)

== Events ==
- 26 June: Jørgen Jørgensen's Revolution: Danish adventurer Jørgen Jørgensen arrived in Iceland, declared the country independent from Denmark–Norway and pronounced himself its ruler. However, with the arrival of HMS Talbot two months later, Danish rule in Iceland was restored and Jørgensen was arrested.

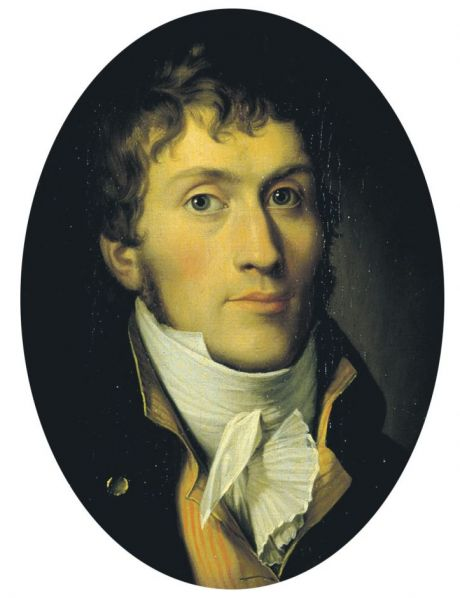
Jørgen Jørgensen (29 March 1780 – 20 January 1841)
