= 1819 in Iceland =

- Decades: 1790s; 1800s; 1810s; 1820s; 1830s
- See also: Other events in 1819 · Timeline of Icelandic history

Events in the year 1819 in Iceland.

== Incumbents ==
- Monarch: Frederick VI
- Governor of Iceland: Ehrenreich Christopher Ludvig Moltke

== Events ==
- Ehrenreich Christopher Ludvig Moltke takes over the role of Governor of Iceland, replacing Johan Carl Thuerecht von Castenschiold.
- Printing of Klausturpósturinn, Iceland's first monthly publication moves from Beitistaðir to the Viðey printing house.

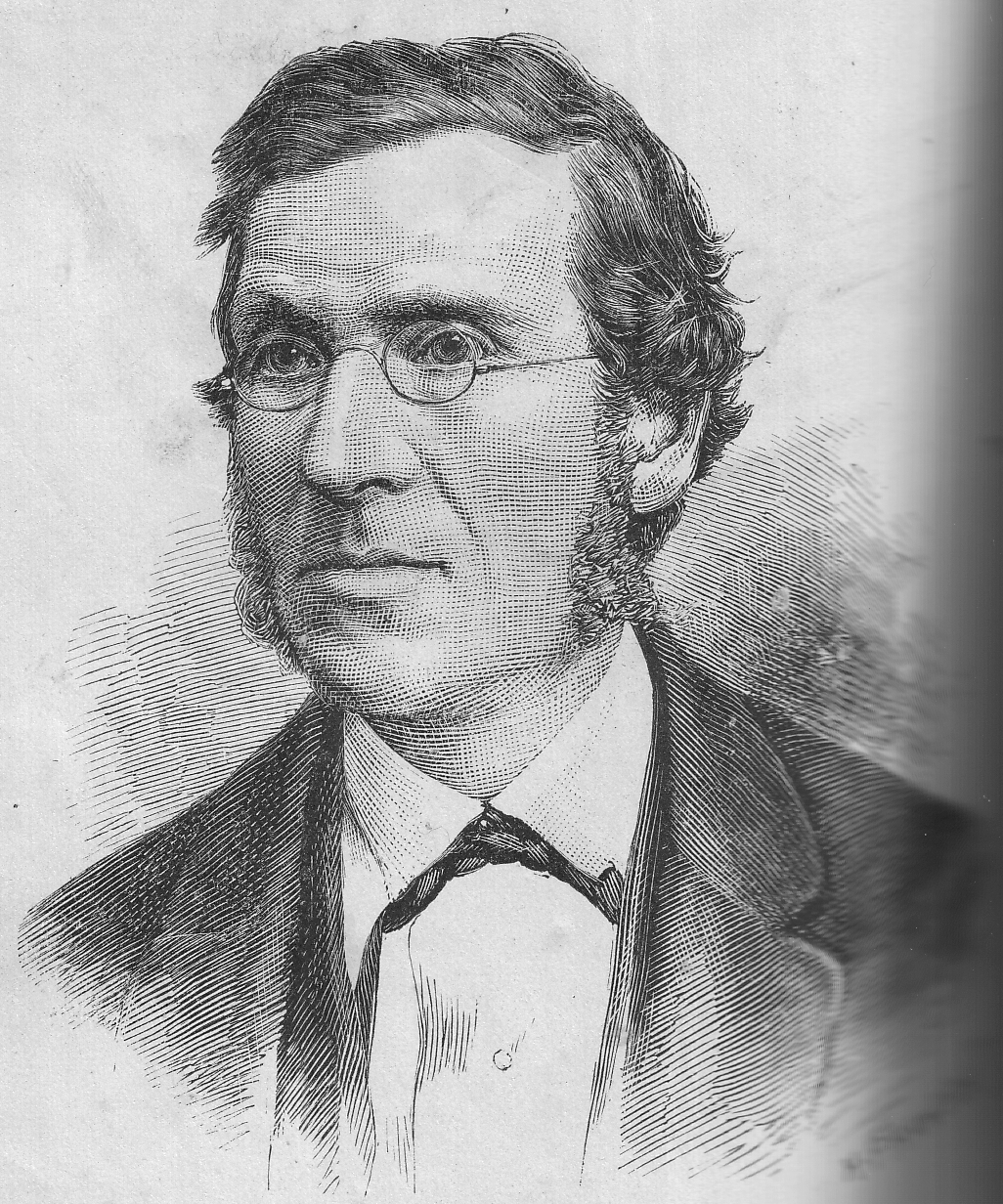
Jón Árnason (17 August 1819 – 4 September 1888)

== Births ==
- August 17: Jón Árnason, author
