= 1823 in Iceland =

- Decades: 1800s; 1810s; 1820s; 1830s; 1840s
- See also: Other events in 1823 · Timeline of Icelandic history

Events in the year 1823 in Iceland.

== Incumbents ==
- Monarch: Frederick VI
- Governor of Iceland: Ehrenreich Christopher Ludvig Moltke

== Events ==
- A group of men hike Eyjafjallajökull to inspect craters. They discovered a fissure vent near the summit caldera a bit to the west of Guðnasteinn.
- Katla under the Mýrdalsjökull ice cap erupted.

== Deaths ==
- March 12: Stefán Þórarinsson, politician.
- September 20: Geir Vídalín, first Bishop of Iceland.
