= 1821 in Iceland =

- Decades: 1800s; 1810s; 1820s; 1830s; 1840s
- See also: Other events in 1821 · Timeline of Icelandic history

Events in the year 1821 in Iceland.

== Incumbents ==
- Monarch: Frederick VI
- Governor of Iceland: Ehrenreich Christopher Ludvig Moltke

== Events ==
- Damage is caused by a minor eruption of Eyjafjallajökull. The main eruption phase began on 20 December.

== Deaths ==
- Sæmundur Hólm, clergyman and poet.
