= 1808 in Iceland =

- Decades: 1780s; 1790s; 1800s; 1810s; 1820s
- See also: Other events in 1808 · Timeline of Icelandic history

Events in the year 1808 in Iceland.

== Incumbents ==
- Monarch: Christian VII (Until 13 March 1808) Frederick VI (onwards)
- Governors of Iceland: Frederik Christopher Trampe

== Events ==
- 13 March: Frederick VI becomes King, following the death of his father Christian VII.
- Napoleonic Wars: English raiders arrived, after sinking or capturing most of the Danish-Norwegian Navy in the Battle of Copenhagen, the amount of gunpowder in Iceland was so small that the governor of Iceland, Count Trampe, could not offer any resistance.
- The British naturalist William Hooker traveled around Iceland for the first time.

== Births ==
- 3 July: Konráð Gíslason, grammarian and philologist.
