= 1808 =

1808 in various calendars
- Gregorian calendar: 1808; MDCCCVIII
- Ab urbe condita: 2561
- Armenian calendar: 1257; ԹՎ ՌՄԾԷ
- Assyrian calendar: 6558
- Balinese saka calendar: 1729–1730
- Bengali calendar: 1214–1215
- Berber calendar: 2758
- British Regnal year: 48 Geo. 3 – 49 Geo. 3
- Buddhist calendar: 2352
- Burmese calendar: 1170
- Byzantine calendar: 7316–7317
- Chinese calendar: 丁卯年 (Fire Rabbit); 4505 or 4298 — to — 戊辰年 (Earth Dragon); 4506 or 4299
- Coptic calendar: 1524–1525
- Discordian calendar: 2974
- Ethiopian calendar: 1800–1801
- Hebrew calendar: 5568–5569
- Hindu calendars
- Vikram Samvat: 1864–1865
- Shaka Samvat: 1729–1730
- Kali Yuga: 4908–4909
- Holocene calendar: 11808
- Igbo calendar: 808–809
- Iranian calendar: 1186–1187
- Islamic calendar: 1222–1223
- Japanese calendar: Bunka 5 (文化５年)
- Javanese calendar: 1734–1735
- Julian calendar: Gregorian minus 12 days
- Korean calendar: 4141
- Minguo calendar: 104 before ROC 民前104年
- Nanakshahi calendar: 340
- Thai solar calendar: 2350–2351
- Tibetan calendar: མེ་མོ་ཡོས་ལོ་ (female Fire-Hare); 1934 or 1553 or 781 — to — ས་ཕོ་འབྲུག་ལོ་ (male Earth-Dragon); 1935 or 1554 or 782

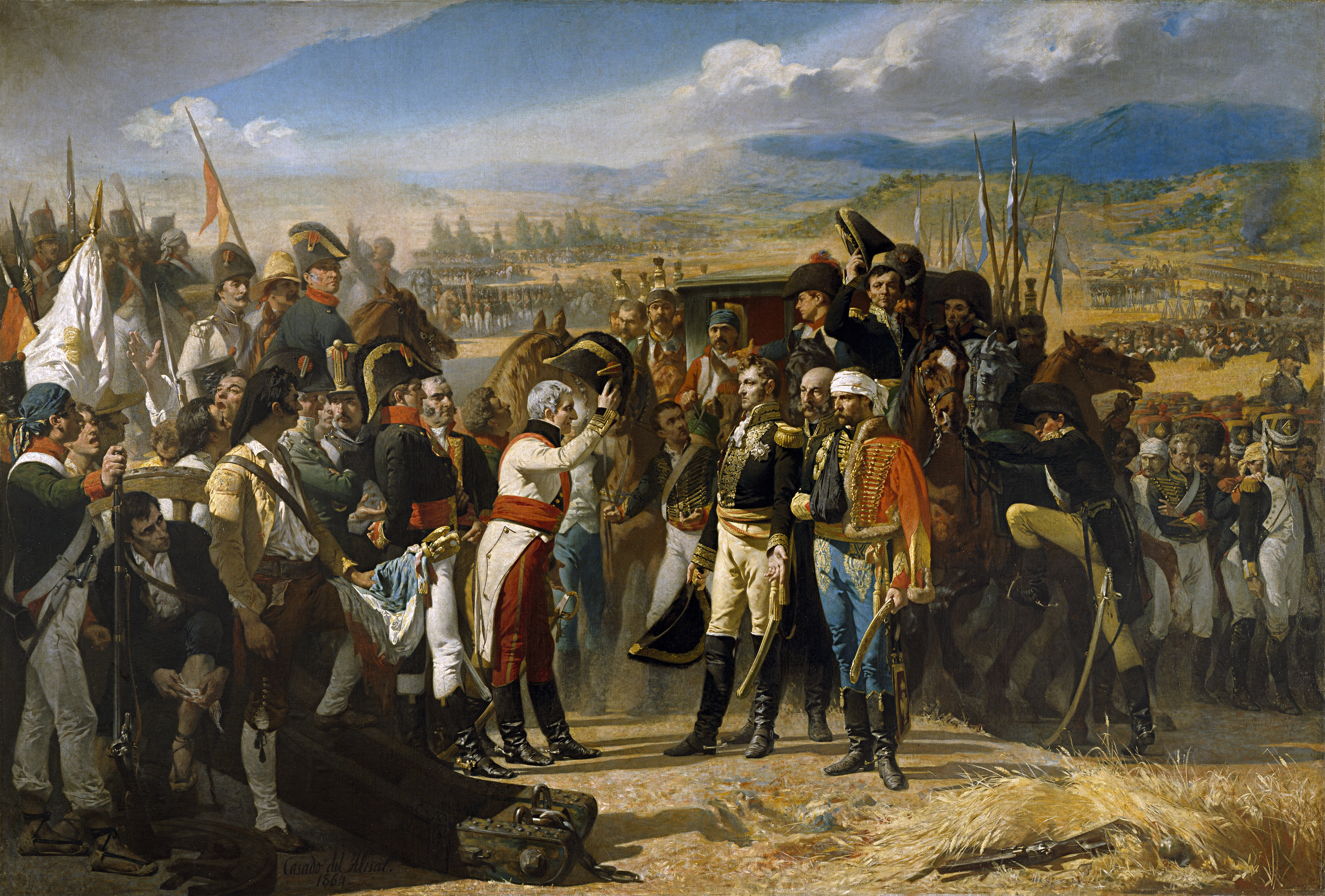
July 22: Spain defeats French occupying forces at Battle of Bailén.

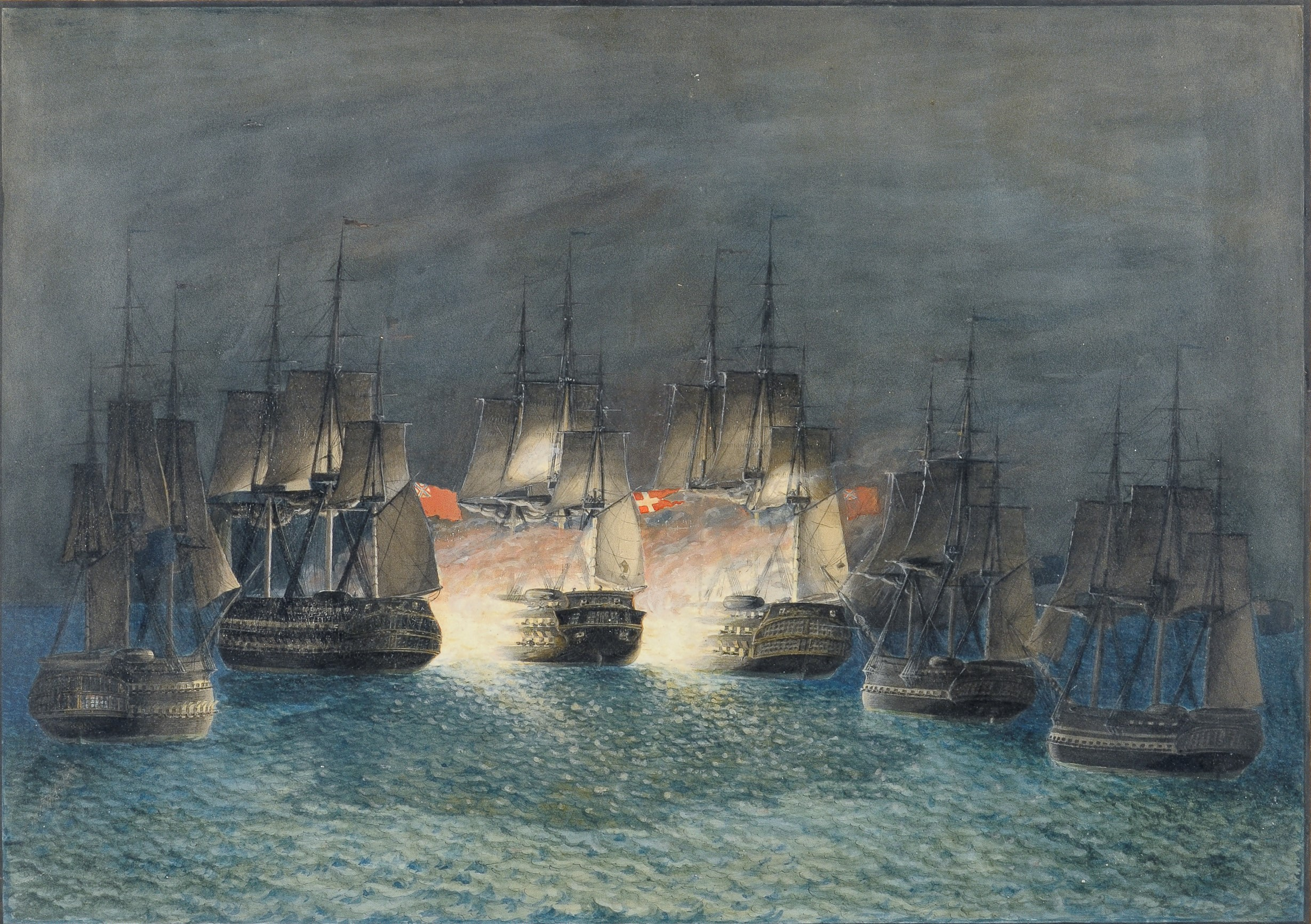
March 22: Britain defeats Denmark-Norway at the Battle of Zealand Point.

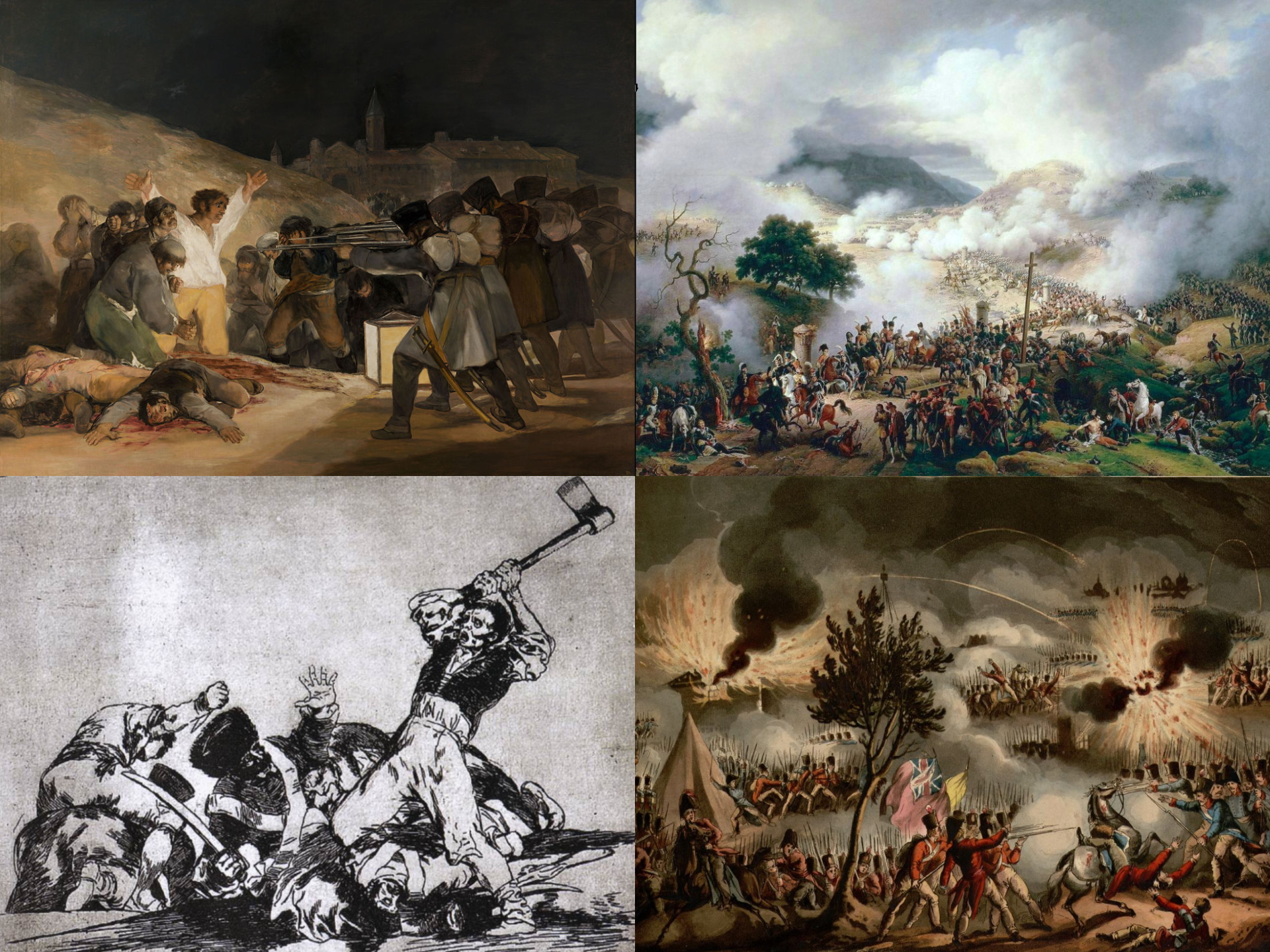
May 2: The Peninsular War begins as citizens of Spain begin uprising against the French occupiers.

1808 (MDCCCVIII) was a leap year starting on Friday of the Gregorian calendar and a leap year starting on Wednesday of the Julian calendar, the 1808th year of the Common Era (CE) and Anno Domini (AD) designations, the 808th year of the 2nd millennium, the 8th year of the 19th century, and the 9th year of the 1800s decade. As of the start of 1808, the Gregorian calendar was 12 days ahead of the Julian calendar, which remained in localized use until 1923.

== Events ==
=== January–March ===
- January 1
  - The importation of slaves into the United States is formally banned, as the 1807 Act Prohibiting Importation of Slaves takes effect. However Americans still continue the slave trade by transporting Africans to Cuba and Brazil.
  - Sierra Leone becomes a British Crown Colony.
- January 22 – Transfer of the Portuguese court to Brazil: John (Dom João), Prince Regent, and the Braganza royal family of Portugal arrive in their colony of Brazil in exile from the French occupation of their home kingdom.
- January 26 – Rum Rebellion: On the 20th anniversary of the foundation of the colony of New South Wales, disgruntled military officers of the New South Wales Corps (the "Rum Corps") overthrow and imprison Governor William Bligh and seize control of the colony.
- February 2 – French troops take Rome as part of the Napoleonic Wars.
- February 6 – The ship Topaz (from Boston April 5, 1807, hunting seals) "rediscovers" the Pitcairn Islands; only one HMS Bounty mutineer is still alive, John Adams, who is using the pseudonym Alexander Smith.
- February 11 – In Wilkes-Barre, Pennsylvania, Jesse Fell becomes the first known person to burn anthracite coal as residential heating fuel.
- February 21
  - The Finnish War begins as Russian troops cross the border into Finland without a declaration of war.
  - Russia issues an ultimatum to Sweden, to join Napoleon's Continental System against the United Kingdom.
- March 1 – The slave trade is abolished by the United Kingdom in all of its colonies as the Slave Trade Act 1807 takes effect. This year, the British Royal Navy establishes the West Africa Squadron on the coast of West Africa to enforce the abolitionist Blockade of Africa.
- March 2
  - Russian troops occupy Helsinki and threaten Sveaborg.
  - The inaugural meeting of the Wernerian Natural History Society, a Scottish learned society, is held in Edinburgh (preliminary meeting January 12).
  - A minor naval battle which takes place off the coast of Scarborough results in the capture of the Danish brig Admiral Yawl, commanded by Danish adventurer Jørgen Jørgensen.
- March 7 – Transfer of the Portuguese court to Brazil: The Portuguese royal court arrives in Rio de Janeiro, making it the centre of the Portuguese Empire.
- March 11 – Russian troops occupy Tampere in Finland.
- March 13 – Upon the death of Christian VII, Frederick VI becomes king of Denmark. The next day (March 14), Denmark declares war on Sweden.
- March 19 – Charles IV of Spain abdicates in favor of his son, Ferdinand VII.
- March 22
  - Russian troops occupy Turku in Finland.
  - English Wars (Scandinavia): Battle of Zealand Point – British ships defeat those of Denmark and Norway.

=== April–June ===
- April
  - A volcano erupts from an unknown location in the western Pacific. This causes a localized drop in marine air temperatures during this year and a worldwide drop in marine air temperature for the following decade.
  - Prussian philosopher Johann Gottlieb Fichte publishes his Addresses to the German Nation, having delivered them over the winter at the Prussian Academy of Sciences in Berlin before crowded audiences.
- April 6 – John Jacob Astor incorporates the American Fur Company.
- April 16 – Troops under Colonel Carl von Döbeln clash with Russian troops in Pyhäjoki, Finland.
- May 2 – Peninsular War: Dos de Mayo Uprising – The people of Madrid rise up against the French troops.
- May 3
  - Finnish War: The fortress of Sveaborg is lost by Sweden to Russia.
  - The Madrid rebels who rose on May 2 are executed near the hill of Príncipe Pío (Goya paints the fight and the execution in 1814).
- May 6 – Ferdinand VII is forced to abdicate as King of Spain by Napoleon. This effectively ends the Anglo-Spanish War (1796–1808) as the United Kingdom allies with Spain and Portugal against the French in the Peninsular War.
- June 12 – Finnish War: A landing of Swedish troops at Ala-Lemu, near Turku, fails.
- June 15–August 14 – Peninsular War: First siege of Zaragoza – Spanish resist the French.
- June 19 – Finnish War: A second landing of Swedish troops at Ala-Lemu fails.
- June 30
  - Finnish War – Battle of Turku: The Swedish archipelago fleet defeats the Russians.
  - English chemist Humphry Davy informs the Royal Society of London of his isolation and discovery of two elements by electrolysis. From lime, he has produced calcium and established that lime is calcium oxide; by heating boric acid and potassium in a copper tube, he creates a substance he calls boracium, which is eventually called boron. This year he also isolates magnesium and strontium.

=== July–September ===
- July 5 – Wooster, Ohio, established and named for General Wooster.
- July 8 – Joseph Bonaparte approves the Bayonne Statute, a royal charter intended as the basis for his rule as King of Spain, during the Peninsular War.
- July 14 – Finnish War: Swedish troops under Colonel Adlercreutz force the Russians to withdraw in Lapua.
- July 22 – Peninsular War: Battle of Bailén: French General Dupont surrenders to Spanish irregular forces.
- August 1 – Peninsular War: British expeditionary force lands near Porto.
- August 10 – Finnish War: Swedish troops under Carl von Döbeln defeat a Russian attack in Kauhajoki.
- August 17
  - Peninsular War: Battle of Roliça: A British-Portuguese army under Sir Arthur Wellesley defeats an outnumbered French army under General Henri Delaborde.
  - The Finnish War: the Battle of Alavus is fought.
- August 21 – Peninsular War: Battle of Vimeiro – British-Portuguese troops under Wellesley defeat the French under General Jean-Andoche Junot.
- September 13 – Finnish War – Battle of Jutas – Swedish forces under Lieutenant General Georg Carl von Döbeln beat the Russians, making von Döbeln a Swedish war hero.
- September 27 – The Congress of Erfurt, between the emperors Napoleon I of France and Alexander I of Russia, begins.
- September 29 – Finnish War: A truce is declared between Swedish and Russian troops in Finland.

=== October–December ===
- October 12 – Banco do Brasil, a major financial group in South America, founded in Rio de Janeiro, Brazil.
- November 8 – 1808 United States presidential election: James Madison defeats Charles C. Pinckney, winning 122 electoral votes to Pinckney's 47. Ten of the 17 states choose their electors by popular vote; the rest choose through state legislatures. George Clinton, who is separately elected as vice president, gets six electoral votes for president.
- November 12 – Four large French frigates under the command of Jacques Félix Emmanuel Hamelin, including the Venus, are sent to operate from Isle de France (Mauritius) against British trade in the Indian Ocean, triggering the Mauritius campaign of 1809–1811.
- November 15 – Mahmud II (1808–1839) succeeds Mustafa IV (1807–1808), as sultan of the Ottoman Empire.
- November 19 – A new truce at Olkijoki ends fighting in Finland, and Swedish troops concede that area to Russia.
- November 23 – Peninsular War: Battle of Tudela: French forces under Marshal Jean Lannes defeat a Spanish army.
- November 30 – Peninsular War: Battle of Somosierra: A French cavalry charge of the Polish Chevau-léger (some 8,000 horsemen) of the Imperial Guard under Baron Jan Kozietulski overwhelm the Spanish positions at Somosierra. The victory removes the last obstacle barring the road to Madrid.
- December 1 – Tsar Alexander I of Russia proclaims Finland a part of Russia.
- December 5 – Emperor Napoleon I joins the French army in Spain. He takes command to restore French authority after early disasters.
- December 9 – At 20:34 UTC, Mercury occults Saturn (there are no observation records).
- December 20
  - Peninsular War: Second siege of Zaragoza begins.
  - The original Covent Garden Theatre in London is destroyed by a fire, along with most of the scenery, costumes and scripts.
- December 22 – Beethoven concert of 22 December 1808: Ludwig van Beethoven conducts and plays piano in a marathon benefit concert, at the Theater an der Wien in Vienna, consisting entirely of first public performances of works by him, including Symphony No. 5, Symphony No. 6, Piano Concerto No. 4 and Choral Fantasy.

=== Date unknown ===
- Goethe's Faust, Part One (Faust. Eine Tragödie, erster Teil) is published in full in Tübingen.
- The Academy of Fine Arts, Munich is given the title of Royal Academy of Fine Arts by King Maximilian I Joseph of Bavaria.
- The Rijksmuseum moves from The Hague to Amsterdam, where it is located temporarily at the Royal Palace.

== Births ==
=== January–June ===
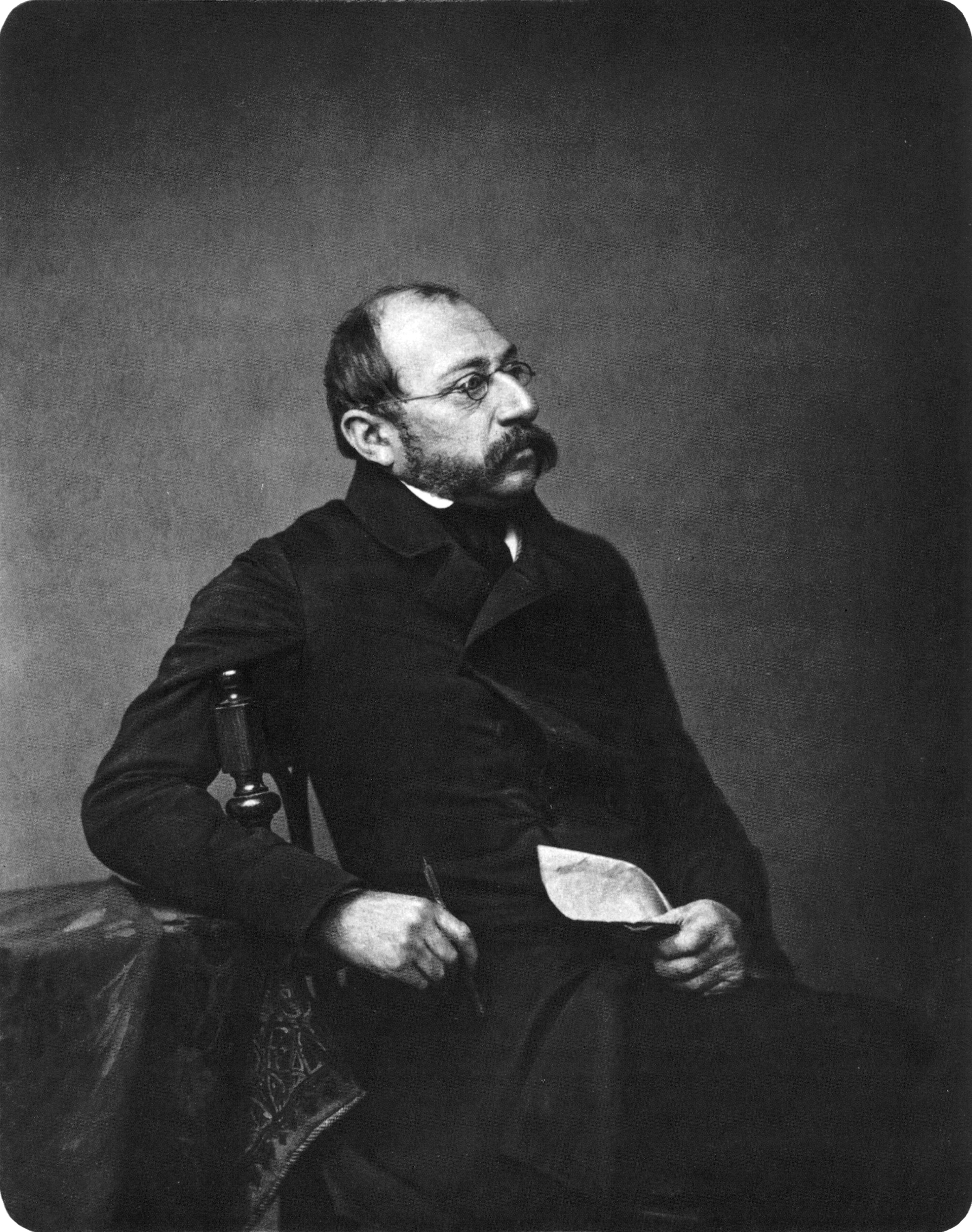
Carl Spitzweg

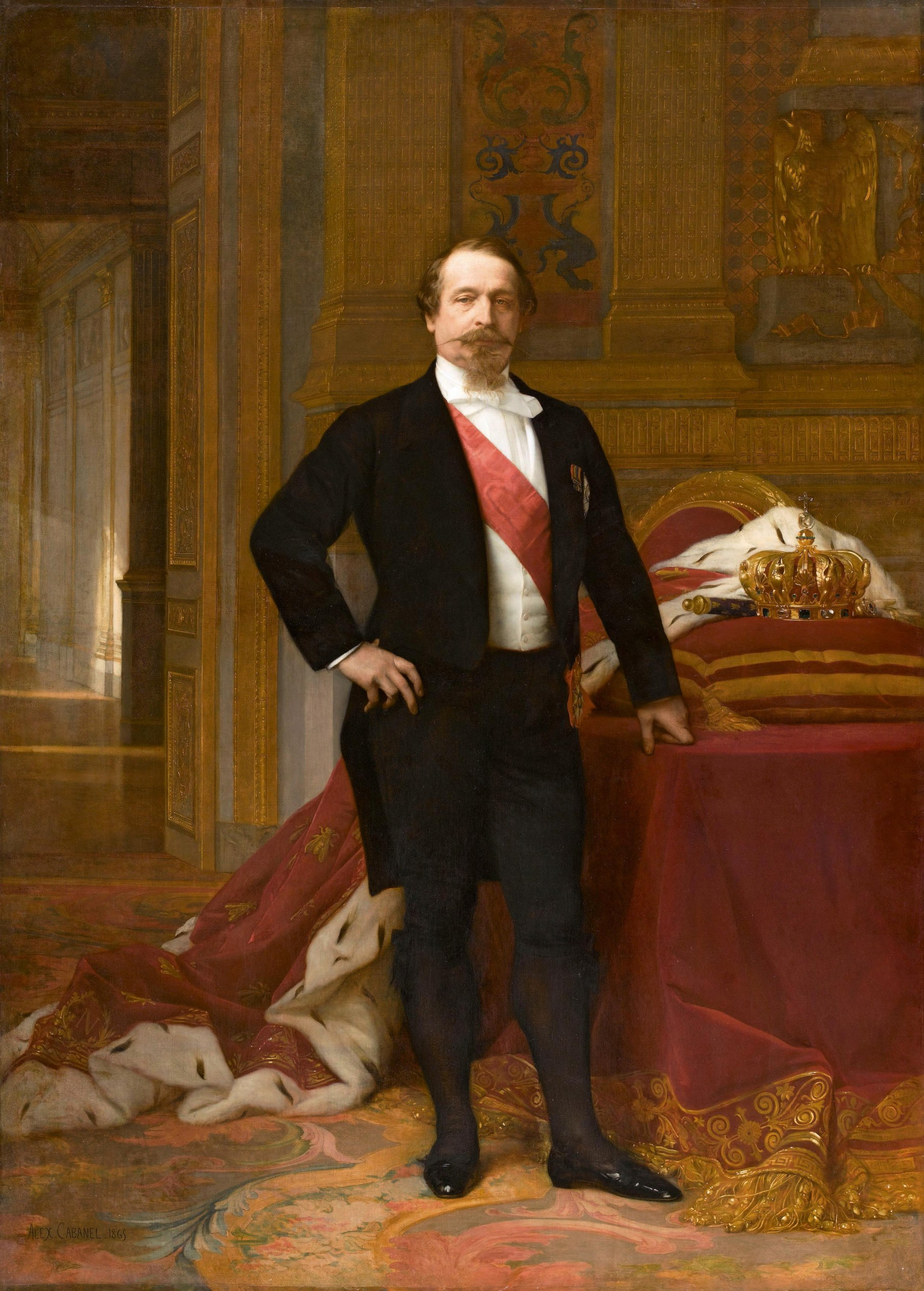
Napoleon III

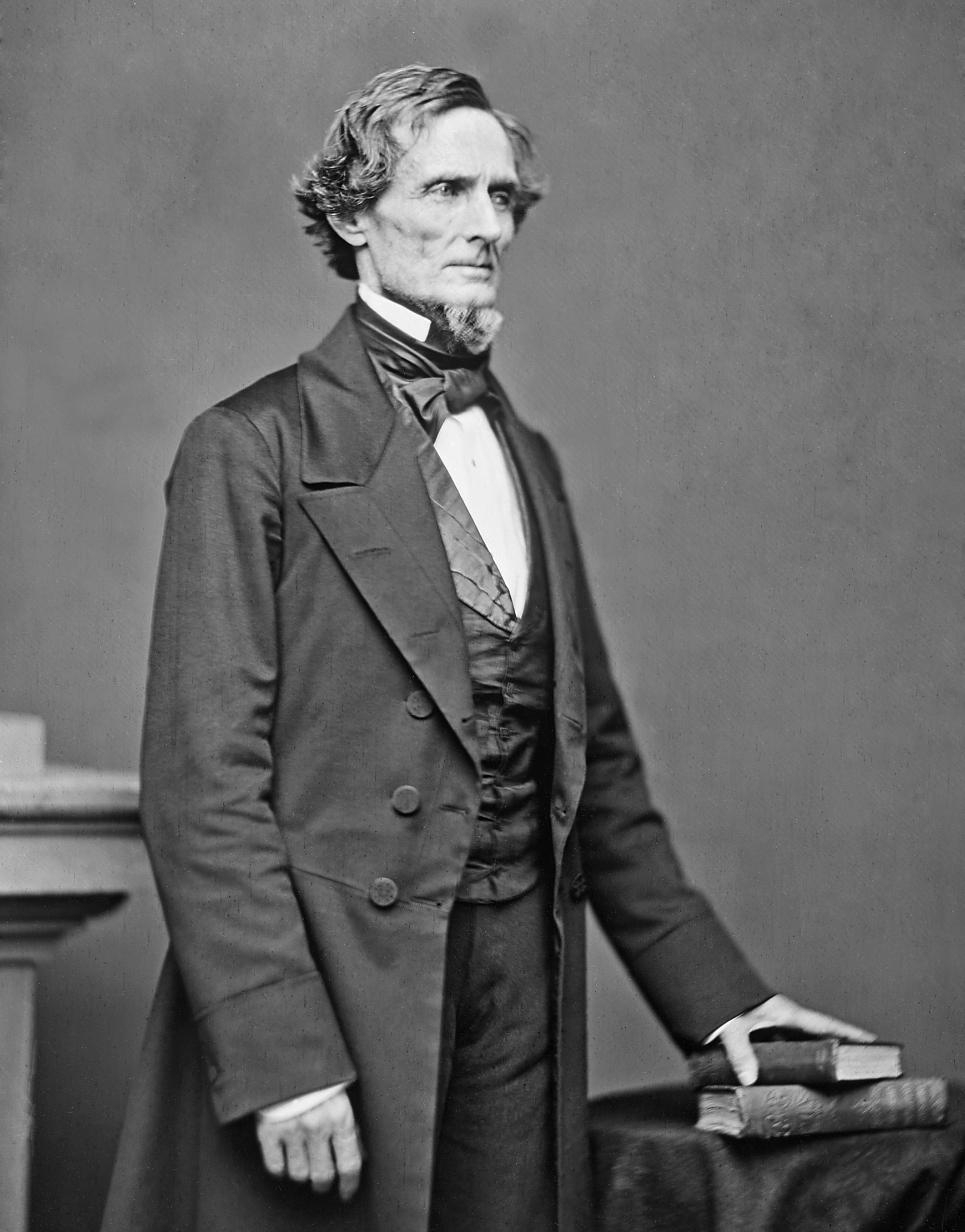
Jefferson Davis

- January 6 – Joseph Pitty Couthouy, American naval officer and paleontologist (d. 1864)
- January 13 – Salmon P. Chase, American politician, Chief Justice of the United States (d. 1873)
- January 19 – Lysander Spooner, American philosopher (d. 1887)
- January 27 – David Strauss, German theologian (d. 1874)
- February 5 – Carl Spitzweg, German painter (d. 1885)
- February 26 – Honoré Daumier, French painter, illustrator and sculptor (d. 1879)
- March 1 – Edward "Ned" Kendall, American bandleader, instrumentalist (keyed bugle) (d. 1861)
- March 17 – Pierre-Louis Dietsch, French composer, conductor (d. 1865)
- March 19 – José María Urvina, 5th President of Ecuador (d. 1891)
- March 22 – Caroline Norton, née Sheridan, English social reformer and author (d. 1877)
- March 24 – Maria Malibran, née García, Spanish-French operatic singer (d. 1836)
- April 13 – Antonio Meucci, Italian-born inventor (d. 1889)
- April 20 – Napoleon III, Emperor of the French (d. 1873)
- May 6 – William Strong, American politician, Associate Justice of the Supreme Court of the United States (d. 1895)
- May 9 – John Scott Russell, Scottish civil engineer (d. 1882)
- May 18 – Venancio Flores, general, president of Uruguay (d. 1868)
- May 21 – David de Jahacob Lopez Cardozo, Dutch Talmudist (d. 1890)
- May 22 – Gérard de Nerval, French writer (d. 1855)
- May 30 – Caroline Chisholm, Australian humanitarian (d. 1877)
- June 3 – Jefferson Davis, President of the Confederate States (d. 1889)
- June 13 – Patrice de MacMahon, Duke of Magenta, French general and politician, first president of the Third Republic (1875–1879) (d. 1893)
- June 16 – James Frederick Ferrier, Scottish metaphysical writer and philosopher (d. 1864)
- June 17 – Henrik Wergeland, Norwegian author (d. 1845)
- June 20 – Samson Raphael Hirsch, German rabbi (d. 1888)

=== July–December ===
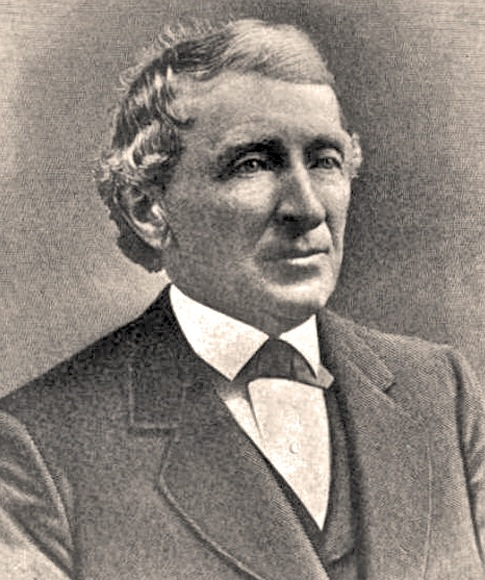
Jesse W. Fell

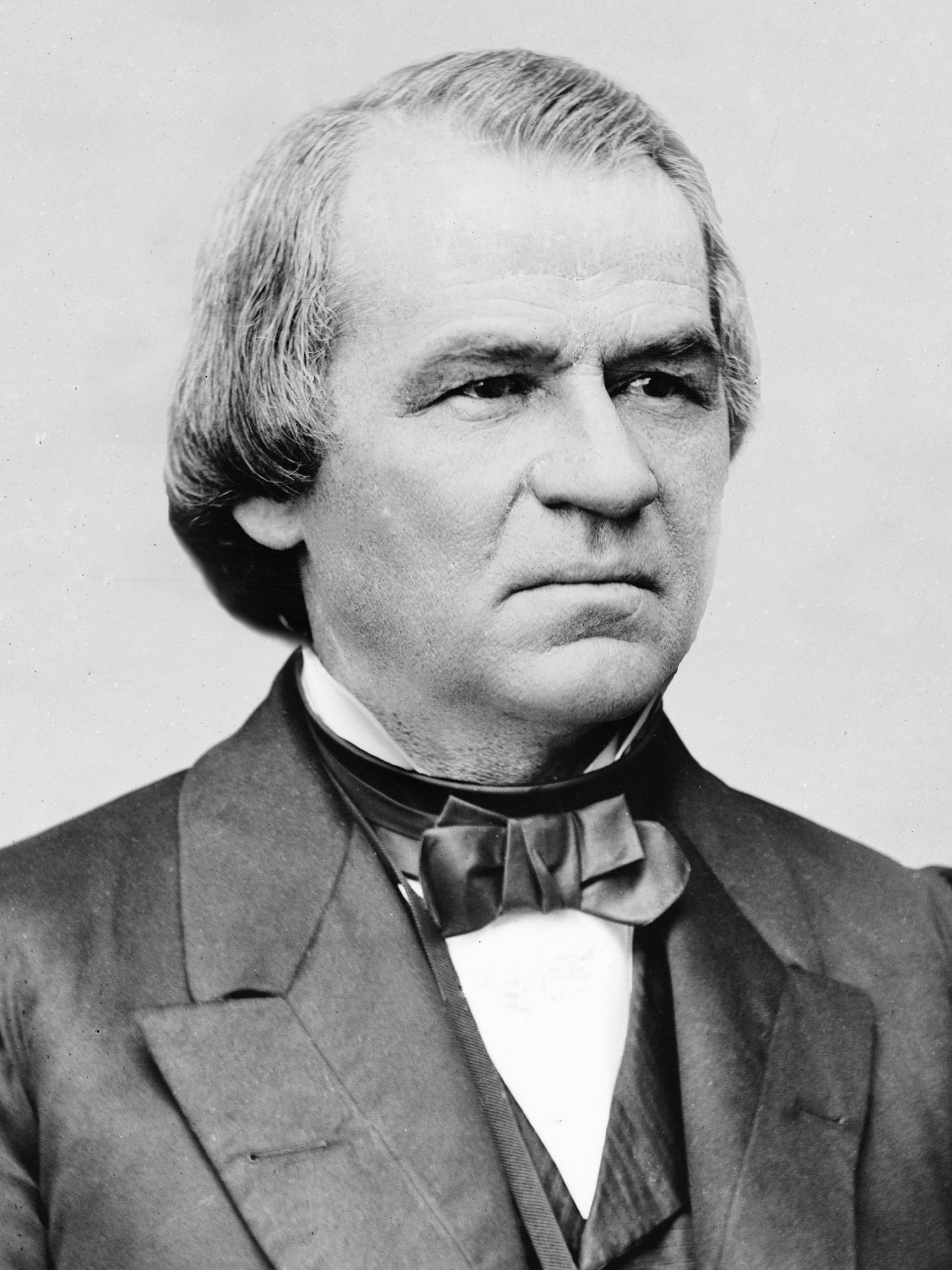
Andrew Johnson

- July 9 – Alexander William Doniphan, American lawyer, military leader (d. 1887)
- July 16 – Daniel Wells Jr., American politician (d. 1902)
- September 7 – William Lindley, English sanitary engineer (d. 1900)
- September 9 – Wendela Hebbe, Swedish journalist (d. 1899)
- September 12 – August von Werder, Prussian general (d. 1887)
- September 15 – John Hutton Balfour, Scottish botanist (d. 1884)
- September 29 – Henry Bennett, American politician (d. 1868)
- October 6 – King Frederick VII of Denmark (d. 1863)
- October 20 – Karl Andree, German geographer (d. 1875)
- November 1 – John Taylor, American Mormon leader (d. 1887)
- November 2 – Jules Amédée Barbey d'Aurevilly, French writer (d. 1889)
- November 6 – Friedrich Julius Richelot, German mathematician (d. 1875)
- November 10 – Jesse W. Fell, American businessman and landowner (d. 1887)
- November 29 – William F. Johnston, American politician (d. 1872)
- December 29 – Andrew Johnson, 17th President of the United States (d. 1875)

== Deaths ==
=== January–June ===
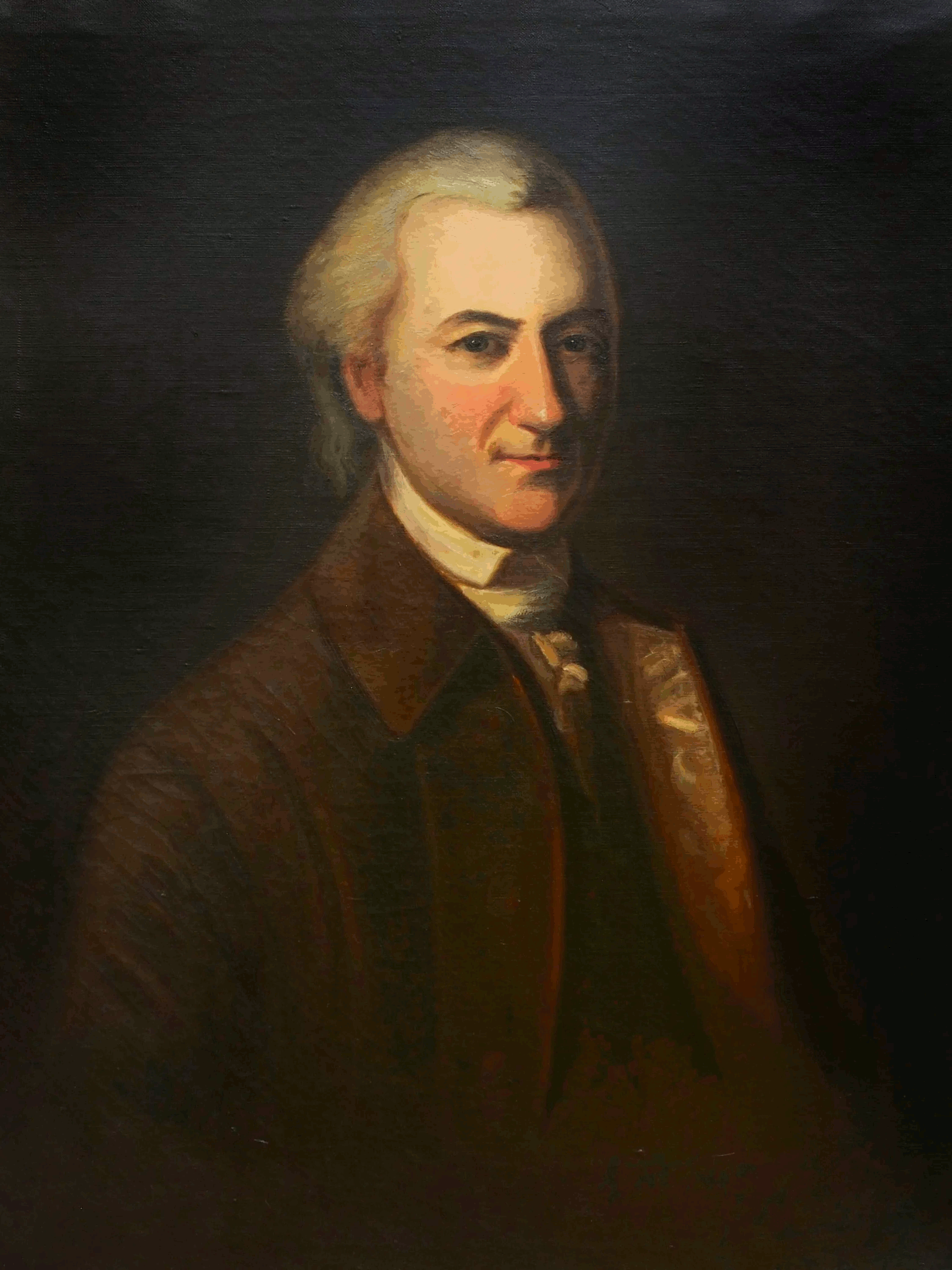
John Dickinson

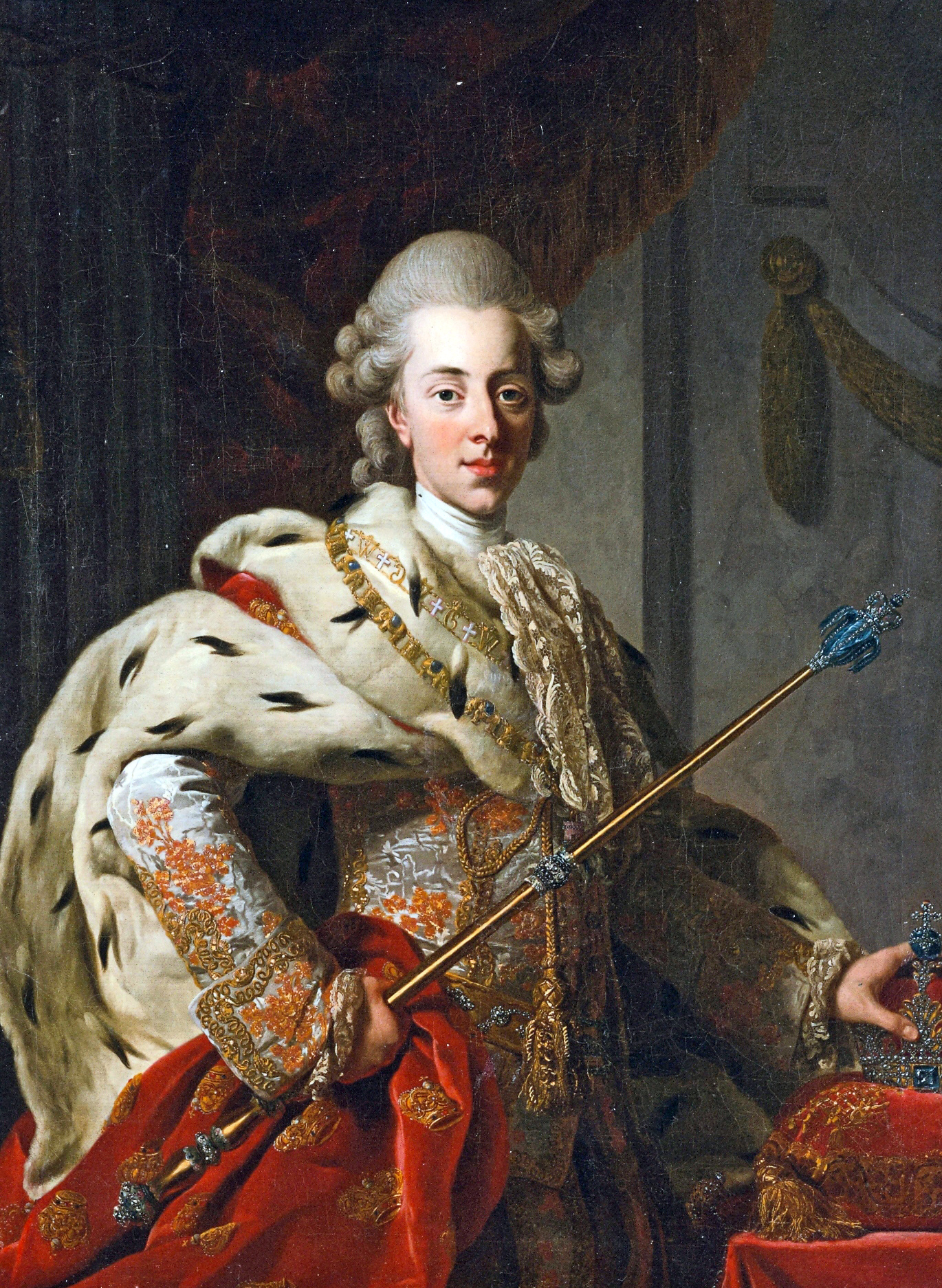
Christian VII, King of Denmark

- January 4 – Prince Benedetto, Duke of Chablais, Italian general in the French Revolution (b. 1741)
- January 5 – Alexei Grigoryevich Orlov, Russian soldier and statesman (b. 1737)
- January 8 – William Linn, American President of Queen's College) (b. 1752)
- February 12 – Anna Maria Bennett, English novelist (d. 1750)
- February 14 – John Dickinson, American lawyer, governor of Delaware and Pennsylvania (b. 1732)
- March 13 – King Christian VII of Denmark (b. 1749)
- May 18 – Elijah Craig, American minister, inventor (b. 1738)
- March 19 – John Redman (physician), American physician (b. 1722)
- May 28 – Richard Hurd, English bishop, writer (b. 1720)

=== July–December ===
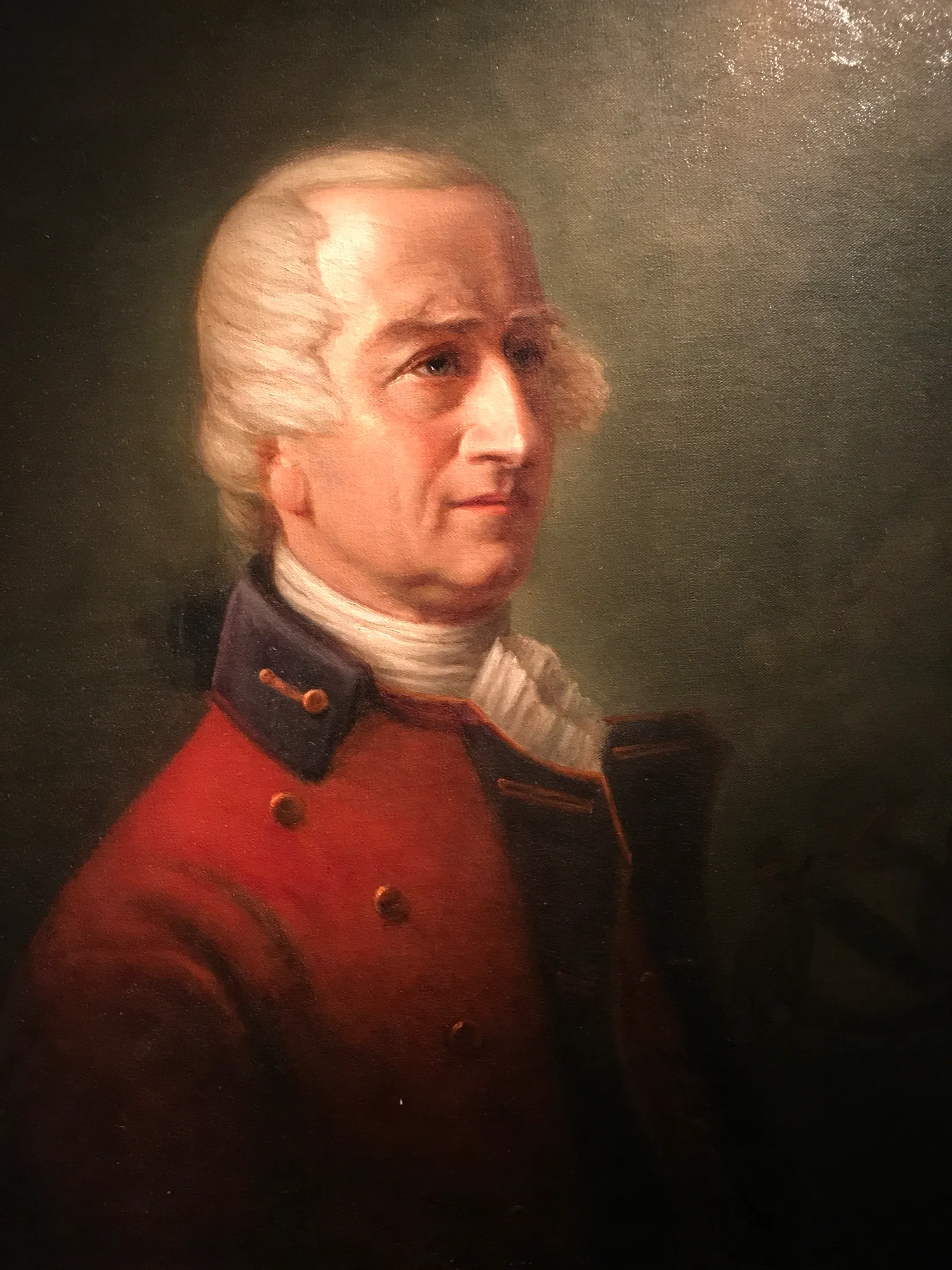
Guy Carleton, 1st Baron Dorchester

- September 3 – John Montgomery, American delegate to the Continental Congress (b. 1722)
- September 5 – John Home, Scottish writer (b. 1722)
- September 6 – Louis-Pierre Anquetil, French historian (b. 1723)
- September 13 – Saverio Bettinelli, Italian writer (b. 1718)
- September 17 – Benjamin Bourne, American politician (b. 1755)
- October 1 – Carl Gotthard Langhans, German architect (b. 1732)
- October 9 – John Claiborne, American politician (b. 1777)
- November 3 – Theophilus Lindsey, English theologian (b. 1723)
- November 10 – Guy Carleton, 1st Baron Dorchester, British soldier, governor of Quebec (b. 1724)
- November 17 – David Zeisberger, Moravian missionary (b. 1721)
