= Jørgen Jørgensen's Revolution =

Revolution on Iceland

- Part of Age of Revolution
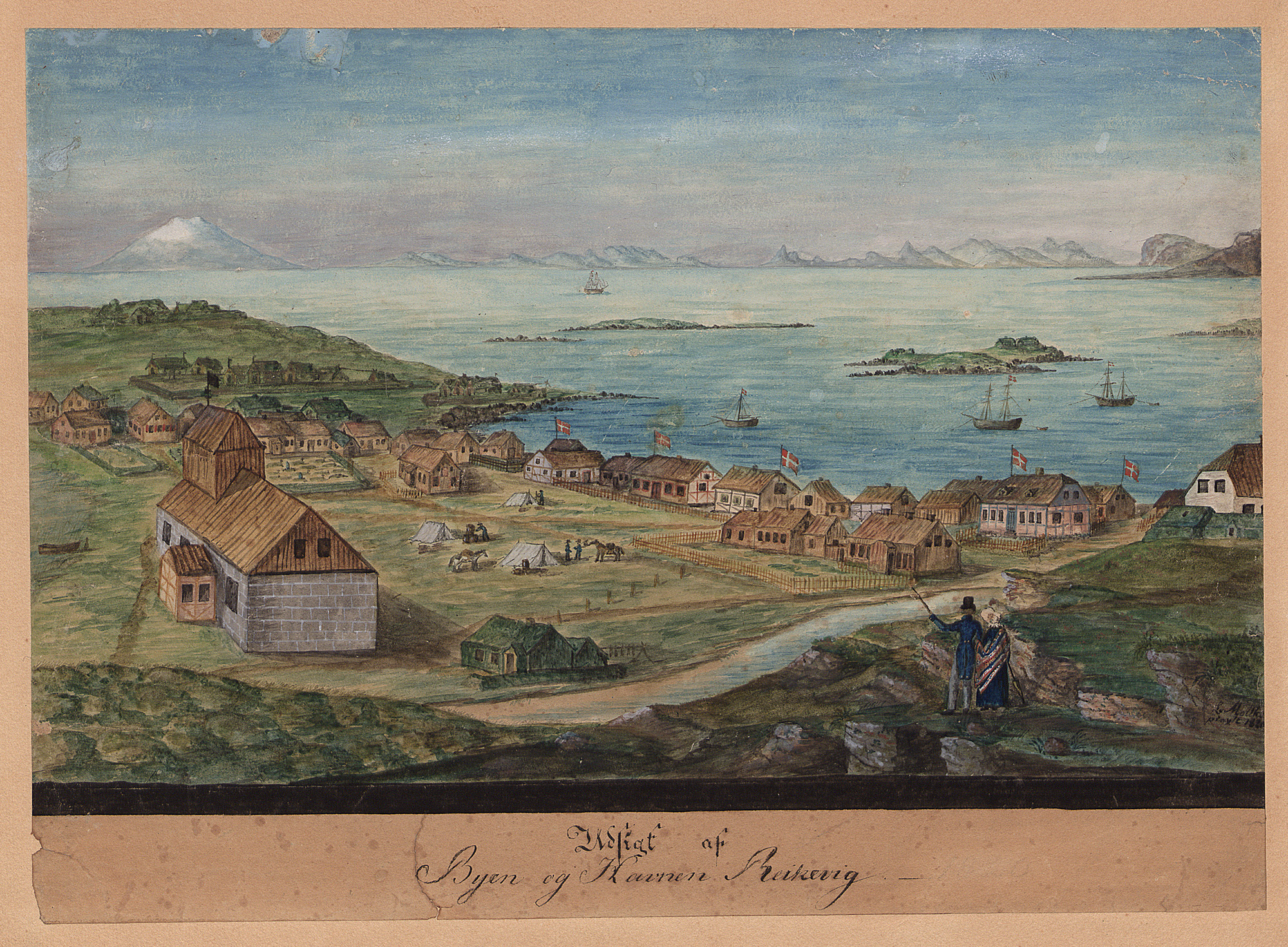
- Reykjavík c. 1820, by commissioner Count E.C. Ludwig Moltke
Date	26 June 1809
Location	Iceland 64°08′48″N 21°56′24″W
Result	Dano-British victory
Territorial changes	Danish government restored

Belligerents
Denmark-Norway United Kingdom	Revolutionaries

Commanders and leaders
(Denmark–Norway) Christopher Trampe (United Kingdom of Great Britain and Ireland) Alexander Jones	Jørgen Jørgensen; James Savignac; Samuel Phelps

Units involved
(United Kingdom of Great Britain and Ireland) HMS Talbot	Clarence; Margaret and Ann

Strength
1 vessel	2 vessels 8–12 men 10 guns

Casualties and losses
None	1 ship

The Jørgen Jørgensen's Revolution (Icelandic: Byltingin 1809) other spelling includes, Jørgen Jürgensen's Revolution and Jørgen Jorgenson's Revolution) was a revolution on Iceland, instituted by the Danish adventurer Jørgen Jørgensen during the Age of Revolution. His intent was to establish a liberal society in the spirit of those emerging in the Americas and Europe at the time. The events have also been referred to as the Revolution of 1809.

== Background ==
Crown Prince Regent

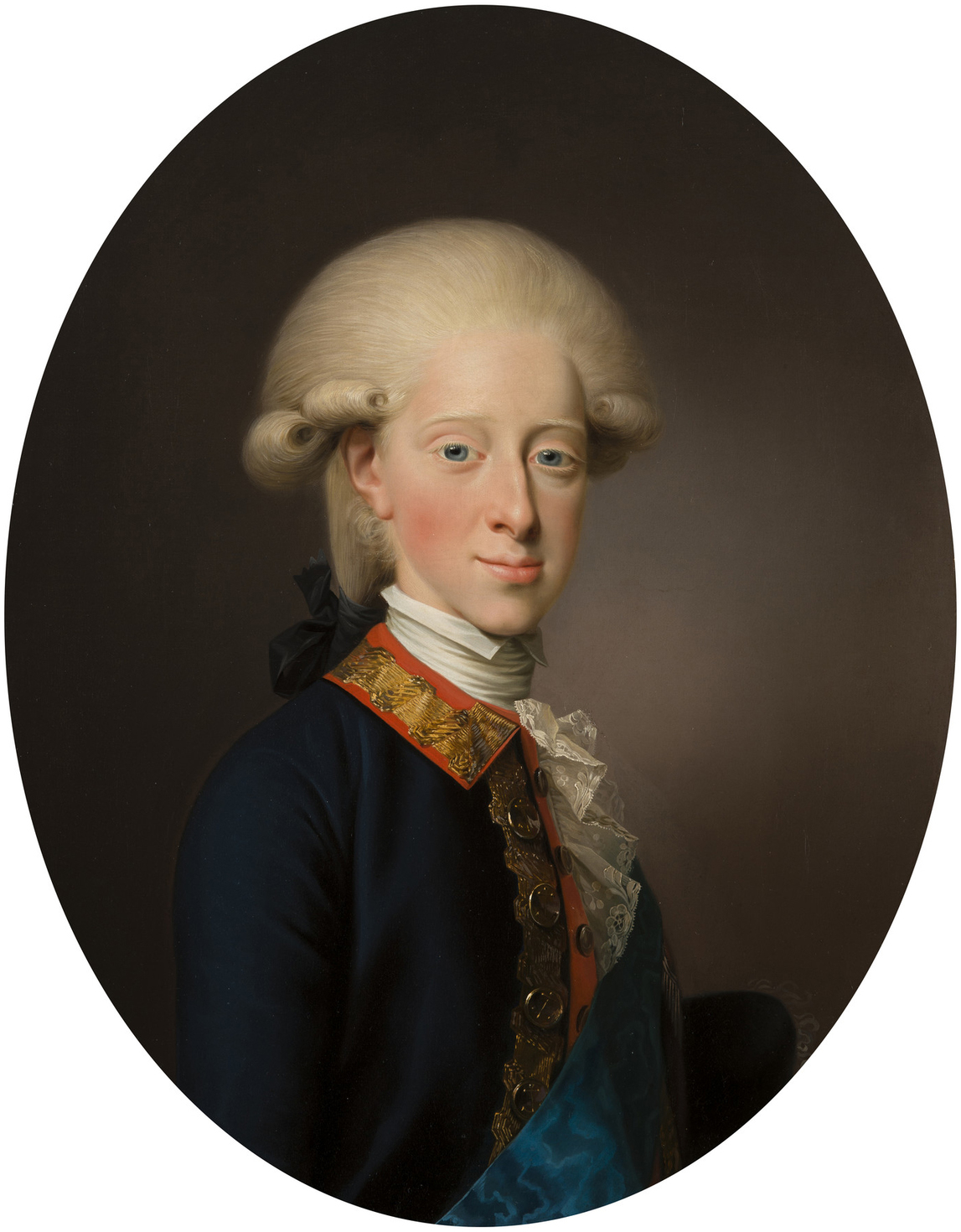
Portrait of Frederick as Crown Prince Regent, by Jens Juel, c. 1784

Since the Age of Enlightenment, revolutionary ideas and reformism spread first to America and France, but soon also to the rest of the world, including the twin realms of Denmark–Norway.

=== Enlightenment in Denmark and Norway ===
Wollstonecraft on Norwegian liberty

"You will be surprised to hear me talk of liberty; yet the Norwegians appear to me to be the most free community I have ever observed."

— Mary Wollstonecraft, letter VII

Denmark-Norway was during the 18th century an ideal enlightened absolutist state. And turned the revolutionary ideas down by reforming the country, under the leadership of privy councillor, Johann Friedrich Struensee, and the young prince regent and later king, Frederick. During his earlier reign, Frederick abolished Serfdom in 1788, hanging as a capital punishment in 1789 and transatlantic slave trade in 1803.

In Norway revolutionary ideas were bigger, yet still small in contrast to the French. Norges Skaal, was banned by Dano-Norwegian officials in 1772, and was labelled "the Norwegian Marseillaise". On the other hand, according to Mary Wollstonecraft Norway appeared to enjoy all aspects of freedom.

The melting pot of Danish and Norwegian revolutionary and reformative ideas lay Copenhagen, where Jørgensen was born on 29 March 1790. On his return from a global expedition, Jørgenson witnessed his home city of Copenhagen being embroiled in the Napoleonic Wars.

=== Jørgensen's role in The English Wars ===
In response to the Battle of Copenhagen, Denmark–Norway declared war on the United Kingdom. Jørgensen enlisted in the Danish navy and was made captain of the privateer brig, the Admiral Juel (English: Admiral Jawl) Jørgensen's seafaring background quickly paid off, and in a couple of months he had captured three prizes. However, he was intercepted off the coast of Scarborough and was brought to London.

== Revolution ==
=== Situation in Iceland ===
"Protector of Iceland"

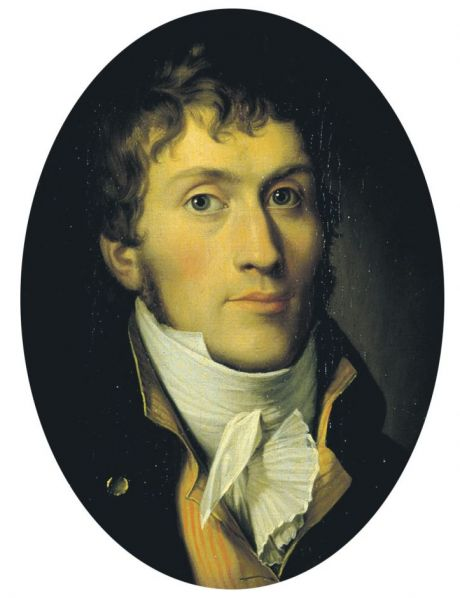
Portrait of Jørgen Jørgensen, by Christoffer Wilhelm Eckersberg, c. 1809

In England, Jørgensen learned about the impact of the war in Iceland from Icelandic merchants. Since the loss of the Dano-Norwegian fleet, Norway, Iceland and Greenland couldn't receive their needed supplies from Denmark. This, including the recently ended Danish trade monopoly over Iceland, and a volcanic eruption in 1783 where over nine thousand Icelanders died, led to a weak Iceland which Jørgensen saw to exploit.

=== First expedition to Iceland ===
Jørgen Jørgensen's description of his takeover

"I laid out my plan without saying a word to anyone preferably, and as the following day was a Sunday, I went in land with 12 of my sailors as soon as I had seen that the whole town had gone into the church. I went straight there to the governor's house, split my little troop into two groups and posted six in front and six behind the building with orders to fire on anyone who tried to interrupt me. Then I opened the door and entered in armed with a couple of pistols. His Grace, there rested on a sofa, was somewhat surprised my sudden appearance. He was alone in the house except for the cook, who was busy making prepare the dinner, a couple of servants and a Danish Lady."

On 29 December 1808, at Liverpool harbour, Jørgensen accompanied and financed by James Savignac and Samuel Phelps, with the additional help of Sir Joseph Banks, embarked for Iceland with supplies for the starving population.

Their vessel Clarence met hostile resistance from the Danish government at Reykjavík, since it displayed the Union Jack Nevertheless, Jørgensen forced an agreement to bring the humanitarian aid ashore. Though, Jørgensen, Phelps, and Banks' humanitarian efforts faced challenges in Reykjavik, as the city's population of around 300 residents were predominantly linked to the colonial Danish government and enjoyed privileged status. This population did not represent the rural Icelanders in need of assistance that the three sought to reach.

=== Second expedition ===
In an attempt to recoup some of the merchants' losses from the first expedition, Jørgensen made a second expedition on the ship Margaret and Ann. Local governor, Frederich Christopher Trampe, Count of Trampe had been absent from the island, when the trade agreement with Jørgensen had been made and immediately scrapped the agreement. When Jørgensen found out, he made a secret plan to overthrow the local government. He besieged the governor's house and imprisoned him while the rest of the city were in church.

Jørgen Jørgensen recalling his takeover

"Unless some more bookish historian can cite an example, I don't know of one revolution in the annals of any nation which has passed more supple, more peaceful, or more resolute than this. The whole government of the island was changed in an instant. I was quite aware of the mood of the population before I made my plan, and knew that I was on safe grounds"

=== Protector of Iceland ===
Flag of Iceland under Jørgensen (1809)

Jørgensen envisioned an Iceland characterized by social democracy and liberty, drawing inspiration from the revolutionary movements in America and France. He also attempted to restore the ancient Althing. Jørgensen disrupted the exploitative practices and monopolies of the Danish colonists, including Count Trampe, by selling grain at significantly reduced prices. He conveyed his intentions through a series of proclamations, gradually adopting a more regal tone. He adopted the title Protector of Iceland. Jørgensen's two-month-rule was harsh against the previous Danish rule and commanded that all guns, swords and ammunition should be handed over to Jørgensen and his crew and all representatives of Denmark should stay inside. If these commands were not followed, there would be capital punishment. Despite his brutal anti-Danish laws, the Icelanders were supportive of the revolution and enlisted in Jørgensen's army. A defensive fort, called Fort Phelps was established.

=== British intervention ===
Jørgensen's successful revolution would not last long though, and on 22 August 1809, the British corvette Talbot, under the command of captain Alexander Jones arrived at the island. Not as an act to support Denmark, but rather because Jørgensen had broken his promise, as a Prisoner of war, not to leave the British Isles. Thus Jørgen Jørgensen was imprisoned, and the Danish government was re-established on the island.

== Aftermath ==
With a short Icelandic independence from Denmark proved the big changes in the 19th century for the multinational Danish Realm, Five years later, Norway would too revolt against the provisions at Kiel. And forty years later, the national revolutions spread to Schleswig and Holstein. Jørgen Jørgensen was sat before the English court and would later settle in Tasmania, participating in the Black War.
