= 1820 in Iceland =

- Decades: 1800s; 1810s; 1820s; 1830s; 1840s
- See also: Other events in 1820 · Timeline of Icelandic history

Events in the year 1820 in Iceland.

== Incumbents ==
- Monarch: Frederick VI of Denmark
- Governor of Iceland: Ehrenreich Christopher Ludvig Moltke

== Events ==
- The oldest known text containing Atla saga Ótryggssonar, one of the sagas of Icelanders, was written.

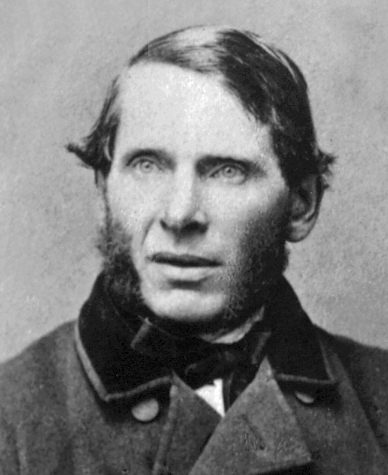
Grímur Thomsen (May 15, 1820 – November 27, 1896)

== Births ==
- May 15: Grímur Thomsen, poet and editor
- August 16: Sölvi Helgason, artist
