= 1804 in Iceland =

- Decades: 1780s; 1790s; 1800s; 1810s; 1820s
- See also: Other events in 1804 · Timeline of Icelandic history

Events in the year 1804 in Iceland.

== Incumbents ==
- Monarch: Christian VII
- Governors of Iceland: Ólafur Stefánsson

== Events ==
- Murderer Bjarni Bjarnason from Sjöundá escaped from prison in Reykjavík. He was caught again two weeks later.
- Frederik Christopher Trampe became county sheriff of West County.
- Hólavallarskóli is moved to Bessastaðir.
