= 1803 in Iceland =

- Decades: 1780s; 1790s; 1800s; 1810s; 1820s
- See also: Other events in 1803 · Timeline of Icelandic history

Events in the year 1803 in Iceland.

== Incumbents ==
- Monarch: Christian VII
- Governors of Iceland: Ólafur Stefánsson

== Events ==
- April 15 – Reykjavík is made a special jurisdiction with its own magistrate by royal decree. The first person to hold that position was the Dane Rasmus Frydensberg. His representative was Finnur Magnússon. In addition, two police officers were appointed, both of whom were Danish.
- November – The King confirms the death sentence of murderers Bjarni Bjarnason and Steinunn Sveinsdóttir at Sjöundá.

== Death ==
- 18 July – Magnús Ketilsson, 71, author.
