= 1817 in Iceland =

- Decades: 1790s; 1800s; 1810s; 1820s; 1830s
- See also: Other events in 1817 · Timeline of Icelandic history

Events in the year 1817 in Iceland.

== Incumbents ==
- Monarch: Frederick VI
- Governor of Iceland: Johan Carl Thuerecht von Castenschiold

== Events ==
- The Icelandic Literary Society published their first book which contained Sturlunga saga together with Saga Árna biskups Þorlákssonar.
