= 1802 in Iceland =

- Decades: 1780s; 1790s; 1800s; 1810s; 1820s
- See also: Other events in 1802 · Timeline of Icelandic history

Events in the year 1802 in Iceland.

== Incumbents ==
- Monarch: Christian VII
- Governors of Iceland: Ólafur Stefánsson

== Events ==
- Hans Jonatan, an escaped slaved from the West Indies arrives in Iceland, landing in Djúpivogur unbeknownst to the Danish government.
- The Sjöundá Murders: Bjarni Bjarnason and Steinunn Sveinsdóttir murder a man and woman at a farm in Sjöundá.

== Births ==
- 1 March – Vilhelmína Lever, shopkeeper and restaurateur
