= 1806 in Iceland =

- Decades: 1780s; 1790s; 1800s; 1810s; 1820s
- See also: Other events in 1806 · Timeline of Icelandic history

Events in the year 1806 in Iceland.

== Incumbents ==
- Monarch: Christian VII
- Governors of Iceland: Frederik Christopher Trampe

== Events ==
- Frederich Christopher Trampe, Count of Trampe takes over the role of Governor of Iceland, replacing Ólafur Stefánsson.

== Births ==
- 22 June: Magnús Eiríksson, theologian
