= 1816 in Iceland =

- Decades: 1790s; 1800s; 1810s; 1820s; 1830s
- See also: Other events in 1816 · Timeline of Icelandic history

Events in the year 1816 in Iceland.

== Incumbents ==
- Monarch: Frederick VI
- Governor of Iceland: Johan Carl Thuerecht von Castenschiold

== Events ==
- The Icelandic Literary Society is founded.
- Grímsvötn erupted.
- Iceland made the clergy responsible for smallpox vaccination and gave them the responsibility of keeping vaccination records for their parishes.
