= 1807 in Iceland =

- Decades: 1780s; 1790s; 1800s; 1810s; 1820s
- See also: Other events in 1807 · Timeline of Icelandic history

Events in the year 1807 in Iceland.

== Incumbents ==
- Monarch: Christian VII
- Governors of Iceland: Frederik Christopher Trampe

== Events ==
- Trade with Denmark and Norway ends due to the invasion of the British during the Napoleonic Wars and their capture of the neutral Danish fleet at Copenhagen, they had credible intel that Napoleon using the Continental System was going to seize that fleet and invade Great Britain.
- Grímsvötn erupts.

== Births ==
- 16 November: Jónas Hallgrímsson, poet, writer and naturalist.
