= 1818 in Iceland =

- Decades: 1790s; 1800s; 1810s; 1820s; 1830s
- See also: Other events in 1818 · Timeline of Icelandic history

Events in the year 1818 in Iceland.

== Incumbents ==
- Monarch: Frederick VI
- Governor of Iceland: Johan Carl Thuerecht von Castenschiold

== Events ==
- Landsbókasafn Íslands, the former National Library of Iceland is established at the instigation of Danish antiquarian Carl Christian Rafn and the Icelandic Literary Society.
- Klausturpósturinn, the first monthly publication to be published in the Icelandic language begins printing at Beitistaðir.

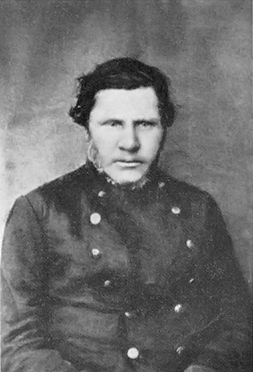
Jón Thoroddsen elder (October 5, 1818 – March 8, 1868)

== Births ==
- Jón Thoroddsen elder, poet.
