= 1815 in Iceland =

- Decades: 1790s; 1800s; 1810s; 1820s; 1830s
- See also: Other events in 1815 · Timeline of Icelandic history

Events in the year 1815 in Iceland.

== Incumbents ==
- Monarch: Frederick VI
- Governor of Iceland: Johan Carl Thuerecht von Castenschiold

== Events ==
- 10 July: The Icelandic Bible Society was founded.
- The Ulricha, a Jewish trade ship rented by Ruben Moses Henriques of Copenhagen, arrived in Iceland.
