= 1822 in Iceland =

- Decades: 1800s; 1810s; 1820s; 1830s; 1840s
- See also: Other events in 1822 · Timeline of Icelandic history

Events in the year 1822 in Iceland.

== Incumbents ==
- Monarch: Frederick VI
- Governor of Iceland: Ehrenreich Christopher Ludvig Moltke

== Events ==
- June – August: Following an eruption the previous year, another sequence of explosive eruptions occurred at Eyjafjallajökull The eruption columns were shot to considerable heights, with ashfall in both the far north of the country, in Eyjafjörður, and in the southwest, on the peninsula of Seltjarnarnes near Reykjavík.
