= 1805 in Iceland =

- Decades: 1780s; 1790s; 1800s; 1810s; 1820s
- See also: Other events in 1805 · Timeline of Icelandic history

Events in the year 1805 in Iceland.

== Incumbents ==
- Monarch: Christian VII
- Governors of Iceland: Ólafur Stefánsson

== Events ==
- The Bessastaðaskóli is founded.

== Deaths ==
- Bjarni Bjarnason, murderer
- Steinunn Sveinsdóttir, murderer
