= Bjarnadóttir =

Bjarnadóttir is an Icelandic surname. Notable people with the surname include:

- Guðbjörg Jóna Bjarnadóttir (born 2001), Icelandic sprinter
- Hafdís Bjarnadóttir (born 1977), Icelandic composer
- Kristín Bjarnadóttir (1812–1891), Icelandic politician
- Kristín Ýr Bjarnadóttir (born 1984), Icelandic footballer
- Sóllilja Bjarnadóttir (born 1995), Icelandic basketball player
- Valgerður Bjarnadóttir (born 1950), Icelandic politician

== See also ==
- Jorunn Bjarnadottir, character
