= HMS Sappho (1806) =

Brig-sloop of the Royal Navy

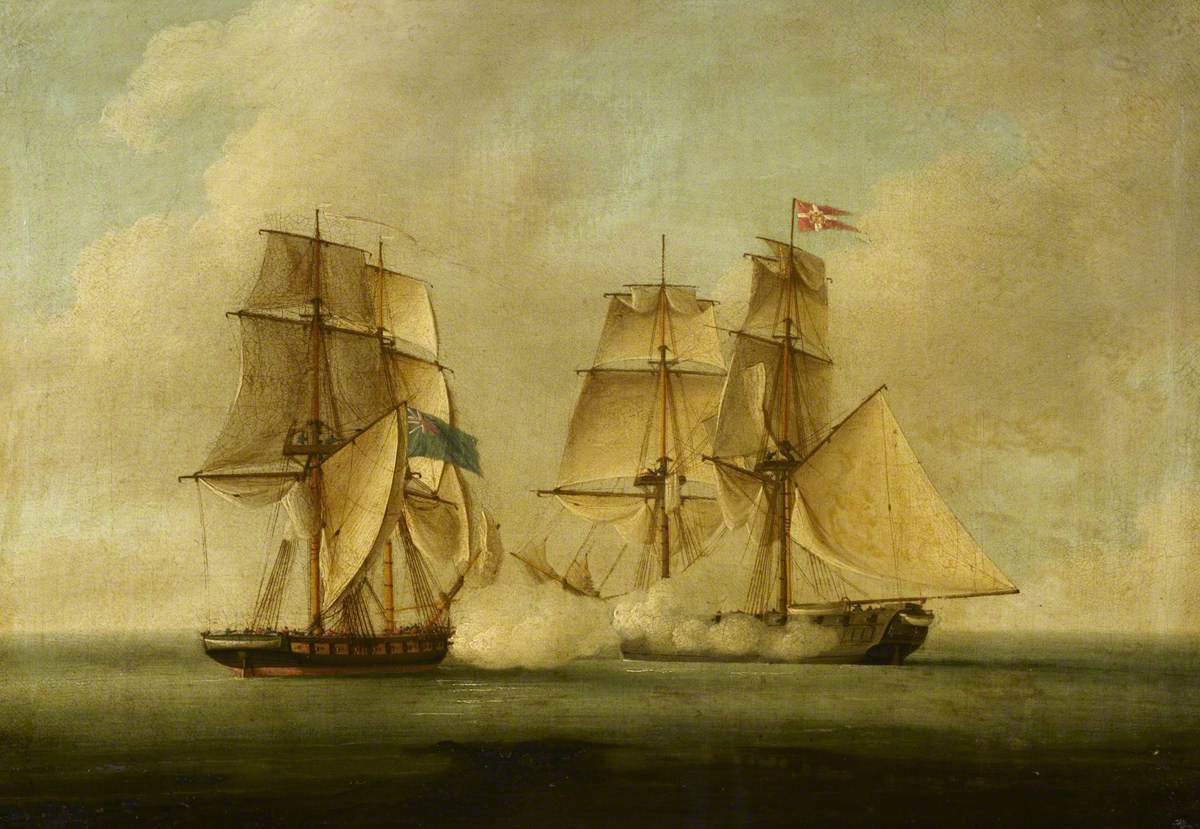
- Sappho (left) at the action of 2 March 1808

History

United Kingdom
- Name: HMS Sappho
- Namesake: Sappho - Greek poet
- Ordered: 27 January 1806
- Builder: Jabez Bayley, Ipswich
- Laid down: April 1806
- Launched: 15 December 1806
- Honours and awards: Naval General Service Medal with clasp "Sappho 2 March 1808"
- Fate: Broken up 1830

General characteristics
- Type: Cruizer class brig-sloop
- Tons burthen: 383 64/94 (bm)
- Length: 100 ft 3 in (30.6 m) (overall); 77 ft 6 1/2 in (23.6 m) (keel)
- Beam: 30 ft 6 in (9.3 m)
- Depth of hold: 12 ft 9 in (3.9 m)
- Propulsion: Sails
- Sail plan: Brig
- Complement: 121
- Armament: 16 × 32-pounder carronades; 2 × 6-pounder chase guns

HMS Sappho was a Cruizer class brig-sloop built by Jabez Bailey at Ipswich and launched in 1806. She defeated the Danish brig Admiral Yawl in a single-ship action during the Gunboat War, (Note: The vessel's name varies by account. Variants include: Admiral Juhl, Admiral Jawl, Admiral Juul, and Admiral Yorol.) and then had a notably successful two months of prize-taking in the first year of the War of 1812. She was wrecked in 1825 off the Canadian coast and then broken up in 1830.

== Gunboat War ==
Sappho was commissioned in February 1807 under Commander George Langford. On 7 September she was present at the Battle of Copenhagen.

On 8 January 1808 Sappho and the Revenue Service brig Royal George, Captain Curry, chased a lugger that surrendered to Royal George. The lugger was Eglée, M. Olivier, of 16 guns (3 and 4-pounders), with a crew of 56 men. She was nine days out of Dunkirk and had taken one prize, Gabriel out of Yarmouth, which she had attempted to scuttle after taking the master and crew on board. Ringdove, one of Sappho's sister ships, found Gabriel, but she was sinking fast and could not be saved. The frigate Ariadne also joined the chase and later shared in the prize money.

The same four British vessels shared in the capture of the privateer Trente et Quarante, of 16 guns and 62 men, though the actual captor was Ringdove. Trente et Quarante was a lugger letter of marque, carrying sixteen 6 and 9 pounder guns, of which 14 were mounted. Her complement was 66 men, of whom 65 were on board, under the command of M. Fanqueux. She was only three months old, was 16 days out of Dunkirk, and had made no captures. Captain Farquar of Ariadne wrote the letters reporting the capture of Eglé and Trente et Quarante, and recommended that the Admiralty purchase the latter.

Sappho was cruising in the North Sea and on the morning of 2 March she was sailing east off Scarborough, when she discovered an armed brig that was steering a course as if intending to cut off several merchant vessels to leeward. Sappho gave chase and at about 1330 hours fired a shot over the brig, which was flying British colours. The brig then fired a broadside at Sappho and exchanged Danish colours for the British colours she been flying to evade scrutiny. Langford immediately bore down and brought what turned out to be Admiral Yawl (or Admiral Juul, or Admiral Yorol) to close action. The engagement lasted about half an hour before Admiral Yawl struck her colours. In the exchange of fire, Sappho had one man wounded and one man injured. Admiral Yawl had two dead: her second officer and a seaman. As a result of the action Langford received promotion to Post-captain, and in 1847 all then surviving officers and crew were qualified to receive the Naval General Service Medal with the clasp "Sappho 2 March 1808".

Sappho carried sixteen 32-pounder carronades and two 6-pounder guns, manned by a crew of 120 men and boys. Admiral Yawl was a brig, but unusual in that she had her armament on two decks; on her first or lower deck she had twelve 18-pounder carronades and on her second, or principal deck, she carried sixteen 6-pounder guns. Her crew consisted of 83 men and boys. The weight of the broadsides favored Sappho at 262 pounds versus 156 pounds for Admiral Yawl, as did the relative size of the crews.

The Danish captain was the colourful and erratic adventurer Jørgen Jørgensen, who in 1801 had been a member of the crew, and perhaps second in command, of Lady Nelson. On Lady Nelson he participated in at least one voyage of exploration along the coast of Australia. In his autobiography he states that his father joined seven other merchants from Copenhagen jointly to purchase Admiral Yawl and present it to the Crown in a spirit of reprisal against the British after the Battle of Copenhagen (1807). The Government commissioned, manned, and armed Admiral Yawl. (Note: It is not clear from this account whether she was a privateer or a naval vessel.) Jorgenson reports that by cutting through the ice a month before it was expected that any vessel could get out, he was able to come unawares among the English traders and capture eight or nine ships before Sappho interrupted his cruise.

In April Commander William Charleton replaced Langford. Charleton then sailed Sappho for Jamaica on 22 June. In 1810 Commander Thomas Graves took command, followed by Commander Edmund Denman in late 1810. Commander Hayes O'Grady had been appointed to command of her on 15 June 1810, but apparently did not take actual command until 1811. (Note: Hayes O'Grady was the father of the Irish antiquarian Standish Hayes O'Grady, and the brother of Standish Hayes O'Grady, 1st Viscount Guillamore.)

== War of 1812 ==
On 13 May 1812, Sappho fired on U.S. Navy Gunboat No. 168. This occurred about a month before the declaration of war. (Note: Commodore J. Rodgers of the US Navy, captured the packet ship Swallow and with it the muster-rolls of Moselle and Sappho. Rodgers reported that these indicated that one-eighth of the crew of each of the two British ships was composed of Americans.) (Note: On 16 March 1815 Erebus fired the last shots of the war when she accidentally fired on Gunboat No. 168 in Wassaw Sound, off Georgia. After No. 168 struck, the British captain apologized, stating that he had not given any order to fire. Fortunately, Erebus's shots had not caused any casualties.) Sappho had intervened to enable the merchant vessel Fernando (or Fernandeno), to escape the port of Fernandina, Florida's Port of Fernandina. With the approval of President James Madison and Georgia Governor George Mathews, insurgents known as the "Patriots of Amelia Island" had seized the island. After raising a Patriot flag, they replaced it with the flag of the United States. American gunboats under the command of Commodore Hugh Campbell, maintained control of the island in an attempt to secure East Florida to prevent a Spanish-English alliance in the area in advance of the war.

In late 1812 Sappho took some nine prizes:

- 21 August - "American droits" Correa de la Havanah.
- 31 August - Santa Maria, bound to Malanzas, laden with provisions.
- 8 September - General Apodaca, bound for Philadelphia with a cargo of sugar, etc.
- 15 September - Alexander (or Alejandro), bound to Havana, laden with flour.
- 26 September - Schooner Josepha, from Baltimore to Havana; together with Rattler.
- 27 September - Sloop Molly (or Polly) from Philadelphia to Havana; together with Rattler.
- 11 October - Schooner Blanche, recaptured, with cargo of dry goods. Another account gives the date as 21 October.
- 13 November - Schooner Flora from San Domingo to Turk's Island.
- 26 November - Schooner Mary from Santiago to Alexandria, Virginia. Sappho brought Mary into Jamaica two days later.

Sappho also sent into Nassau Josefe, Veya, master. A Spanish vessel suspected of carrying American goods.

On 20 June 1813, the US schooner Carolina chased a British 14-gun privateer for three hours when an 18-gun British brig, which the Carolina's captain believed to be Sappho, approached. The two British vessels then set off in pursuit of the American schooner, which, however, after a chase of just over two hours, outdistanced them. The next day Carolina encountered the same British brig again, and again was able to escape.

On 17 July Sappho recaptured Eliza. Three days earlier, the American privateer Saucy Jack, of seven guns and 110 men, had captured Eliza, Lane, master, and Sisters, Butterfield, master, near the Tortugas as they were sailing from Bermuda to Jamaica. Sappho took Eliza into Jamaica.

Next, Sappho recaptured the brig San Francisco Xavier on 3 December. A Carthaginian privateer had captured San Francisco off Baracoa as she was sailing from Teneriffe and Puerto Rico to Havana. Sappho took San Francisco into Jamaica. (Note: Prior to the recapture in 1816 by monarchist forces of the privateer base at Cartagena de Indias, privateers operating out of the port were known as "Carthagenians".) Two days later Sappho captured a Carthagenian privateer.

On 1 January 1814 Sappho captured Ann.

On 7 June 1814, O'Grady advanced to Post-captain while with Sappho on the Jamaica station.

== Post-war ==
Sappho underwent repairs at Chatham in 1815. However, she was not fitted for sea until February to May 1818. On 2 February 1818 she was recommissioned under Commander James Hanway Plumridge, for Cork. He commanded her at Saint Helena and the Irish station.

On 13 August 1820 Sappho and Plumridge captured the American vessel Liberty, and the next day they captured the American vessel Clinton, both smugglers. On 12 October Sappho captured the American smuggling schooner Maria. One of the three vessels had 400 bales of tobacco. (Note: The prize money for Liberty and Clinton was substantial. A first-class share was worth £1666 14s 4 1/2d, or several years' salary for Plumridge. A sixth-class share, that of an ordinary seaman, was worth £27 6s 5 1/2d, or about a year's salary. A second payment for Clinton gave a first-class share £891 17s 10 1/2d, and a sixth-class share £14 12s 4 1/2d. A second payment for Liberty yielded £1304 6s 1d for a first-class share, and £21 7s 8d for a sixth-class share. A third grant brought the first-class share for Liberty £139 14s 10d and the sixth-class shares £2 5s 9 3/4d. A first-class share of the prize money for Maria was worth £841 14s; a sixth-class share was worth £13 8s 7 1/2d.)

Commander Henry John Rous took command in November 1820. In early 1821 Sappho sailed to Cape Town via Lisbon. In Lisbon she took on six survivors from Abeona, which had burnt in the North Atlantic while carrying emigrants from Scotland to South Africa.

Commander William Bruce replaced Rous in March 1822.

In February 1822 she was under Commander Jenkin Jones for the Halifax station. Still, on 16 November 1823 Sappho picked up some spirits at sea. For this the Board of Customs granted a reward to her officers and men. (Note: Judging by the reward money, a first-class share was worth £6 10s 8d and a sixth-class share was worth 1s 11d; the casks were few and not large.)

In April 1824 Commander William Hotham took command. His replacement in April 1825 was Captain W. Canning.

On 14 September Sappho arrived at Halifax in some distress. She had lost the head of her foremast and foretop-mast on 26 August on her passage to Bermuda from Portsmouth. Falling spars had killed one man and wounded four others. Then Sappho struck on the Sisters Rocks in coming into the harbour. The weather was moderate so she was soon off again.

== Loss ==
Although Sappho had been refloated, a survey resulted in her being condemned as unseaworthy and so on 16 November she was paid off. On 20 November her officers boarded Tweed. She left the next day and arrived at Plymouth on 14 December. The Admiralty finally ordered her broken up in 1828, which order was executed in July 1830.
