= Bjarni Thorarensen =

Icelandic poet and official

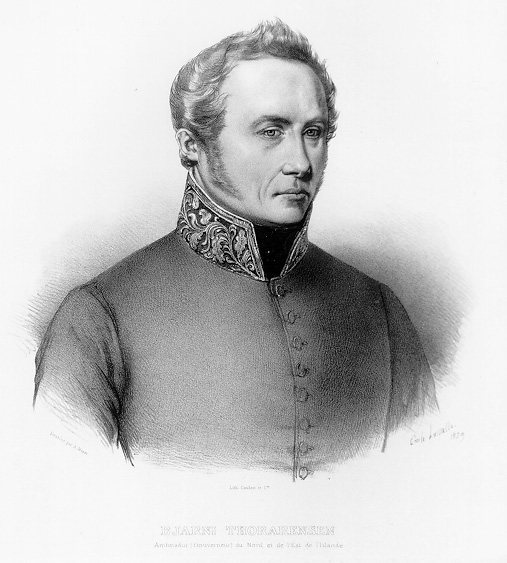
A portrait of Bjarni Thorarensen by Auguste Mayer.

Íslands minni

Bjarni Vigfússon Thorarensen (December 30, 1786 – August 24, 1841) was an Icelandic poet and official. He was deputy governor of northern and eastern Iceland. As a poet he was influenced by classicism and romanticism. Politically he was aligned with the Fjölnismenn and favored the reestablishment of the Althing at Þingvellir. He was a friend of Jónas Hallgrímsson whose own poetry was influenced by Bjarni's work. A notable influence on Bjarni's writings was Sæmundur Hólm.

Bjarni's best known work is Íslands minni, also known as Eldgamla Ísafold.

== See also ==
- List of Icelandic writers
- Icelandic literature
