= Vilhelmína Lever =

Early Icelandic shopkeeper

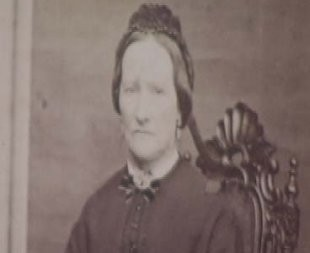
- Born: March 1, 1802; Icelandic
- Died: June 19, 1879 (aged 77); Akureyri, Iceland
- Occupations: Shopkeeper, restaurateur
- Known for: Early female voter in Iceland; first woman to apply for divorce

Vilhelmína Lever (1 March 1802 – 19 June 1879) was an Icelandic shopkeeper and restaurateur from Akureyri in northern Iceland. She is remembered for voting in the municipal elections in 1863 and 1866 before women were officially given voting rights.

== Biography ==
Born on 1 March 1802, Vilhelmína Lever was the daughter of Hans Vilhelms Lever, a merchant, and his wife Þuríður Sigfúsdóttir. She married Thord Daníelsson but obtained a divorce in 1824, becoming the first woman in Iceland to apply for a divorce. She bought a plot of land in Akureyri in 1834, built a small house and opened a shop in 1835.

After spending a few years in Krossanes, she returned to Akureyri in 1852 to run a shop combined with a restaurant. In 1861, she opened a restaurant in the Oddeyri district of Akureyri. She ran it for years, gaining the nickname "Vertshús-Mína" or Tavern-Mina.

New regulations in Danish stated that the town council could be elected by "alle fuldmyndige Mænd" (all men who have reached their majority) who had lived in the town for two years and paid municipal dues. Assuming "mænd" meant all people (as in Icelandic) and not just men, Vilhelmína voted in the municipal elections in both 1863 and 1866.

Later Vilhelmína lived in Nonnahús (Nonni's House), Akureyri's oldest house. She died in Akureyri on 19 June 1879.

== See also ==
- Kristín Bjarnadóttir
