= Woodman (1808 ship) =

History

United Kingdom
- Name: Woodman
- Builder: John Smith, Gainsborough
- Launched: 7 September 1808
- Fate: Lost 1836

General characteristics
- Tons burthen: 397, or 400, or 408, or 40878/94, or 410, or 419, (bm)
- Length: 115 ft 9 in (35.3 m)
- Beam: 28 ft 5 in (8.7 m)
- Armament: 18 × 12-pounder carronades + 2 × 6-pounder guns (1812)

Woodman was launched at Gainsborough in 1808. She traded with northern Spain and then became a West Indiaman, and later a government transport. From 1816 on she made several voyages to India and South East Asia, sailing under a licence from the British East India Company (EIC). She also made two voyages transporting convicts, one to New South Wales (NSW) in 1823 and one to Van Diemen's Land in 1825. She was lost in 1836.

== Career ==
Woodman first appeared in Lloyd's Register (LR) in 1808.

Year	Master	Owner	Trade	Source & notes
1808	R.Brown	Bousfield	London–Corunna	LR
1812	R.Brown; Bousfield	Bousfield	London–Corunna; London–Jamaica	LR
1813	Bousfield; Dunn	Bousfield	London–Jamaica	LR
1814	M'Donald	Bousfield	London transport	LR
1816	M'Donald	Bousfield	London transport London–West Indies	LR
1816	M'Donald	Bousfield	London transport London–CGHope	Register of Shipping; damages repaired 1815

In 1813 the EIC had lost its monopoly on the trade between India and Britain. British ships were then free to sail to India or the Indian Ocean under a licence from the EIC. On 26 February 1816 Woodman, Butler, master, sailed for Bombay under a licence from the EIC. Woodman's owners applied for a licence on 27 February and received the licence the same day.

On 7 February 1818, Woodman, H.Bear, master, sailed for Batavia. She arrived at Batavia on 27 July 1818.

Year	Master	Owner	Trade	Source & notes
1818	M'Donald; Bear	Bousfield; Eastman	London–West Indies; Liverpool–Batavia	LR
1820	W.Kellie	Bousfield	London; London–Calcutta	LR; thorough repair 1819

On 5 June 1820 Woodman, Kellie, master, sailed to Bengal.

Year	Master	Owner	Trade	Source & notes
1822	W.Kellie; H.Ford	Bousfield	London–Calcutta; London–New South Wales	LR; thorough repair 1819
1824	H.Ford	Bousfield	Cork–NSW	LR; thorough repair 1819

Convict voyage to New South Wales (1823): Captain Henry Ford sailed from the Thames on 22 August 1823 and arrived at Cork on 13 September. There Woodman took on both female convicts and about half as many free settler women and children. She sailed from Cork on 25 January 1823, bound for New South Wales. She stopped at Rio de Janeiro on 20 March, where she stayed for three weeks. She arrived at Sydney on 25 June. She had embarked 97 convict women, three of whom died on the voyage. On 20 August, Woodman, Ford, master, sailed for Calcutta.

Year	Master	Owner	Trade	Source & notes
1826	"Woofndle"; Leary	Bonsfield	Liverpool–New Brunswick; London–New South Wales	Register of Shipping (RS); damage repaired 1819

Convict voyage to Van Diemen's Land (1825–1826): Captain Daniel Leary sailed from Sheerness on 6 December 1825. Woodman left the Cape of Good Hope on 4 March and arrived at Hobart on 29 April. She had embarked 150 male prisoners, four of whom died on the voyage. (Note: One of her convicts was the adventurer Jørgen Jørgensen, who in 1801 had been one of the founders of Hobart.) Three officers and 21 men of the 39th Regiment of Foot and 19 men of the 57th Regiment of Foot provided the guard. Woodman sailed from Hobart to Sydney, and then left Sydney on 17 September, bound for London. She encountered bad weather, which slowed her voyage prior too her arriving at Rio de Janeiro. She arrived safely at London on 17 April 1827.

Year	Master	Owner	Trade	Source & notes
1830	H.Ford	Bousfeld	Cowes	LR; thorough repair 1819 and large repair 1825
1832	H.Ford; Trip	Bousfeld	Cowes	LR; thorough repair 1819, large repair 1825, and small repairs 1832

In 1832 new owners transferred Woodman's registration to Bristol.

Year	Master	Owner	Trade	Source & notes
1833	Trip	Cambridge	Bristol–New York	LR; thorough repair 1819, large repair 1825, and small repairs 1832

== Loss ==
Woodman was lost in 1836.
