= David de Jahacob Lopez Cardozo =

Dutch rabbi (1808 – 1890)

David de Jahacob Lopez Cardozo (21 May 1808 in Amsterdam – 11 April 1890 in Amsterdam) was a Dutch Talmudist and communal worker. He was sent at an early age to the bet ha-midrash 'Etz Chayyim, studied under Rabbi Berenstein at The Hague, and received his diploma of "Morenu" in 1839.

The same year he was appointed ab bet din of the Portuguese synagogue of Amsterdam, and in 1852 ab bet din and preacher of that synagogue, Aron Mendes Chumaceiro being made hakham, and Vaz Diaz and Montezinos dayyanim (civil judges) at the same time.

He became dean of the intermediate classes of 'Etz Chayyim, which office he held for nearly half a century. Cardozo was founder of the Chebrah 'Abodat ha-Qodesh, instituted for the study of Jewish law and its commentaries.

After having been decorated by the king of the Netherlands with the Royal Order of the Lion for services rendered to his country, he retired from his various offices in 1888.
