= Sæmundur Hólm =

Sæmundur Magnússon Hólm (1749 – 1821) was an Icelandic clergyman, poet and scholar. He was pastor at Helgafell in Helgafellssveit (1789 – 1819). His poetry was mainly related to nature, including the Skaftáreldar eruption. A number of poets have cited Hólm as being an inspiration, including Bjarni Thorarensen.

== Bibliography ==
- Om jordbranden paa Island i aaret 1783
