= Admiral Juel =

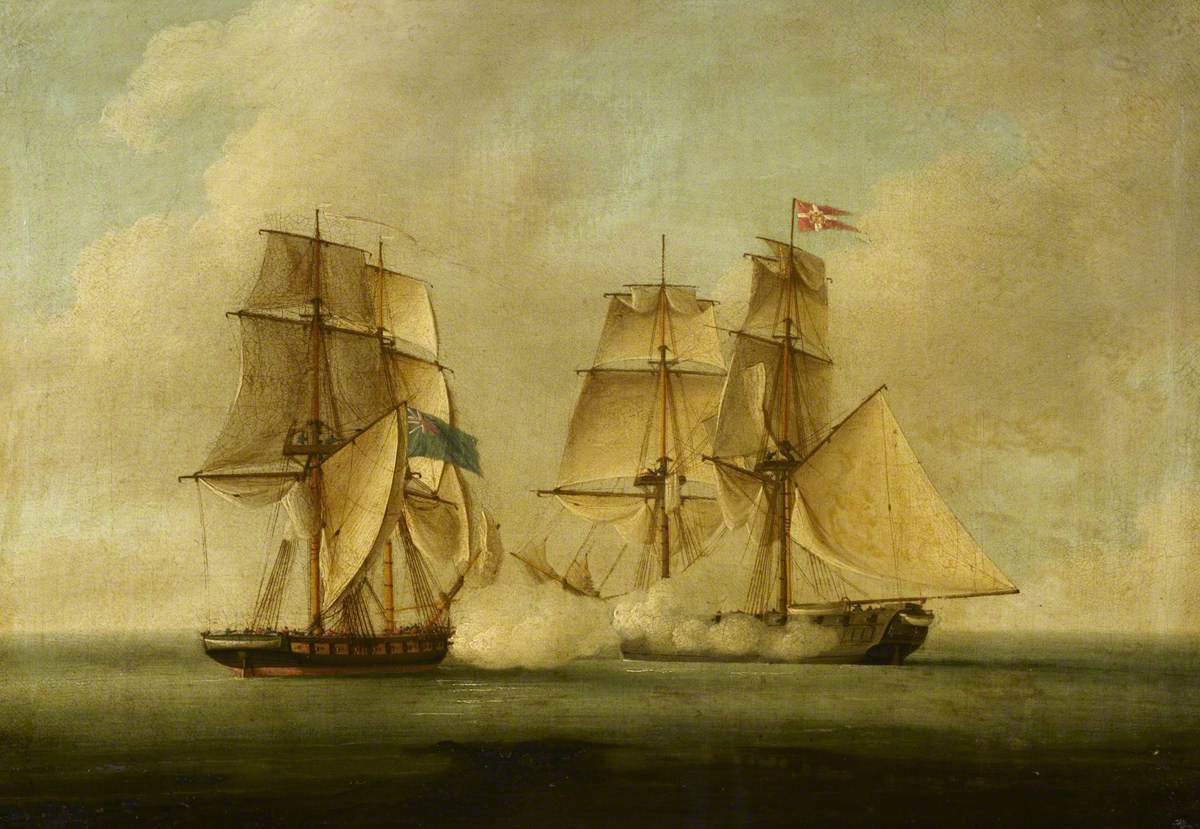
- Admiral Juel (right) at the action of 2 March 1808

History

Denmark
- Name: Christine Henriette
- Owner: Jens Lind & partners of Copenhagen
- Builder: France
- Acquired: By purchase September 1807
- Renamed: Admiral Juel (1807)
- Captured: 2 March 1808

General characteristics
- Tons burthen: 160 (bm)
- Sail plan: Brig
- Complement: 83
- Armament: Upper deck:16 × 6-pounder guns; Lower deck:12 × 18-pounder carronades

Admiral Juel was a 28-gun Danish brig that was used as a privateer during the Gunboat War between Denmark and Britain. The second-largest privateer in Danish service during the conflict, she was captured by the Royal Navy in the action of 2 March 1808.

== Background ==
The 1807 British attack on Copenhagen by land and sea left Denmark with few warships and poor options in continuing the fight with her new enemy. The ship-of-the-line HDMS Prinds Christian Frederik and a handful of brigs were (temporarily) safe in Norwegian ports, and the squadrons of gunboats elsewhere on the coast were primarily for defence.

Within one week of the British forces departing with the remains of the Danish fleet, King Christian VII's government in Copenhagen promulgated the Danish Privateers Regulations (1807). Denmark was at war with Britain, and a part of the fight would fall to privateers.

Denmark and Norway issued Kaperbrev (letters of marque). (Note: The rules applying to kaperbrev are listed in the Danish wikipedia at da:Kaperbrev af 1807, and the Norwegian Wikipedia at no:Kaperfart gives more details. In Norway alone, 322 vessels, with crews from 20 to 70 men, were equipped for privateering. The Norwegian History site reference includes copies of original letters of marque for the two ships Odin and Norges Statholder.)

From 1807 to 1813 Danish shipping companies donated suitable ships (brigs, schooners and galleases) to the state which could then equip the ships for their new privateering role. One such ship was the brig Admiral Juel.

Danish privateers were an important tactical weapon in the furtherance of the war. They were not on an equal footing with the British men-of-war but by forcing British merchant ships to follow a convoy system for protection fewer warships were available for active warfare against Denmark.

== Admiral Juel ==
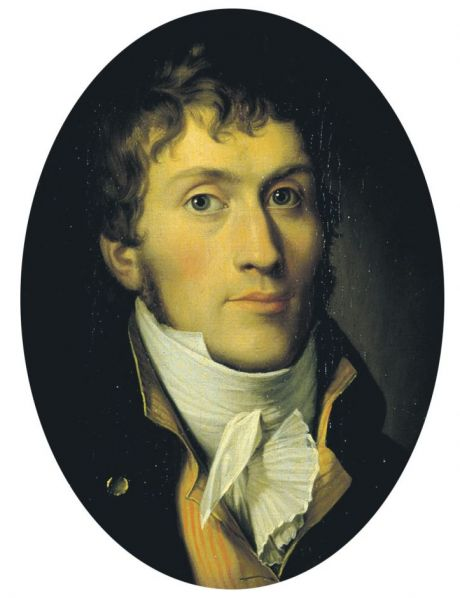
Portrait of Jørgensen by Christoffer Wilhelm Eckersberg

Three Danish merchant ships afloat in 1807 were named Admiral Juel or Admiral N Juel. All three received letters of marque from the Danish authorities, but only one was a brig. The ships were named for the seventeenth century Danish admiral Niels Juel. It is worth emphasising that no ship of this name is recorded as being in the Royal Danish Navy, although four more recent naval ships have been named Niels Juel - nor is her appointed captain Jørgen Jørgensen listed as a Danish naval officer. (Note: The Danish biographer of Captain Jørgen Jørgensen, describes him as an adventurer, fantasist, privateer, prisoner-of-war, preacher, gambler, author, journalist, spy, functionary, exile, and condemned criminal. He was obviously a colourful character.e)

== Events ==
In September 1807 the brewer and captain Jens Lind & partners of Copenhagen acquired the brig Christine Henriette, a French-built merchant ship, and presented her to the state for converting and equipping as a privateer of 28 cannon, and a crew of 91. Jens Lind and partners also invested in another three privateers being equipped at Helsingør by a younger namesake of Jens Lind. On completion of her refit Christine Henriette was renamed Admiral Juel. At 170 tons (bm), the ship was the second largest in the whole of the Danish privateer fleet.

On 4 December 1807 Jørgen Jørgensen was in audience with Crown Prince Frederik and with a little ceremony was granted command of the refitted Admiral Juel. He was awarded a letter of marque and made to swear to respect the rules for privateering that had been formulated a few months earlier. Jörgensen's seamanship and international experience weighed heavily in this decision and rumours of his incorrect political views were discounted.

Impatient to be actively at sea, Jörgensen had his crew break the ice which kept so many ships inactive and sailed out. So early in the season, privateers were not expected and Admiral Juel quickly captured three vessels and brought them back to Copenhagen, where they were greeted with much jubilation.

- Sally of London, a British merchant ship
- Flyvefisken, a Swedish herring boat
- Spring, of Danzig, a Prussian merchant ship

Winter ice reasserted its hold on the harbours of Denmark and it was not until February that he could sail again.

Capture

Sailing in the North Sea Admiral Juel did not find many ships until, off the Yorkshire coast, she encountered two British warships, HMS Sappho and Clio.

Admiral Juel hoisted British colours when challenged by Sappho but when ordered to stop with a warning shot replied with a broadside and hoisted the Danish colours. (Note: This British report of the action does not mention Clio. It also reports the name of the Danish privateer as Admiral Yawl. Later reports of prize money use the name Admiral Juuls.) After half-an-hour of close action Admiral Juel surrendered to Sappho. Her sails, masts, and rigging had been shot to pieces, and two of her crew had been killed. When the news of her loss reached Denmark, conspiracy theorists were sure Jörgensen had turned traitor and deliberately sought out British warships in order to surrender his ship. Jörgensen and his crew were incarcerated on 4 March 1808 at Yarmouth prison as prisoners-of-war.

Two separate notices on the same page of the London Gazette report awards of prize money for the capture of Admiral Juuls (sic) and the presentation of accounts for the proceeds of the hull, stores, and head money.

In 1849 the Admiralty awarded the Naval General Service Medal with clasp "Sappho 2 March 1808" to the surviving claimants from HMS Sappho.
