= Jørgen Jørgensen =

Danish adventurer (1780–1841)

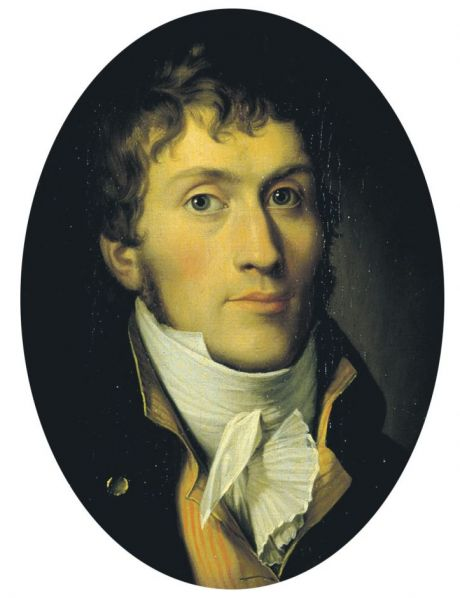
- Jørgen Jørgensen by Eckersberg

Protector of Iceland
- In office 26 June 1809 – 22 August 1809
- Preceded by: Frederich Trampe as Governor of Iceland
- Succeeded by: Frederich Trampe as Governor of Iceland

Personal details
- Born: Jørgen Jürgensen; 29 March 1780 Copenhagen, Denmark
- Died: 20 January 1841 (aged 60) Hobart, Van Diemen's Land
- Occupation: Mariner
- Known for: Privateering; Exploring Tasmania
- Other names: The Dog-Days King

Jørgen Jørgensen (name of birth: Jürgensen, and changed to Jorgenson from 1817) (29 March 1780 – 20 January 1841) was a Danish adventurer during the Age of Revolution. During the action of 2 March 1808, his ship was captured by the British. In 1809 he sailed to Iceland, declared the country independent from Denmark–Norway and pronounced himself its ruler. He intended to found a new republic, following the examples of the United States and the French First Republic. He was also a prolific writer of letters, papers, pamphlets and newspaper articles covering a wide variety of subjects, and for a period was an associate of the famous botanists Joseph Banks and William Jackson Hooker. He left over a hundred written autographs and drawings, most of which are collected in the British Library. Marcus Clarke referred to Jørgensen as "a singularly accomplished fortune wooer—one of the most interesting human comets recorded in history".

== Biography ==
=== Early life and career ===
Jørgensen was born as the second son of the royal watchmaker Jürgen Jürgensen. Two of his brothers were watchmakers; the elder, Urban Jürgensen, was of international renown. At the age of 15, Jørgensen finished school and was apprenticed to Captain Henry Marwood of the British collier Janeon. In 1799, he sailed to Cape Town and from there in 1800 to Port Jackson, the new British colony in Australia and to New Zealand. In 1801, he joined the crew of the Lady Nelson. As a member of that crew, Jørgensen was present at the establishment of the first settlements of Risdon Cove and Sullivans Cove in Van Diemen's Land, as Tasmania was then called. He has been called the founder of the city of Hobart Town, now Hobart, and is still a local hero.

He became a mate on the crew of the whaling ship Alexander, and aboard her he returned to Britain, arriving at Gravesend in June 1806.

=== Admiral Juel ===
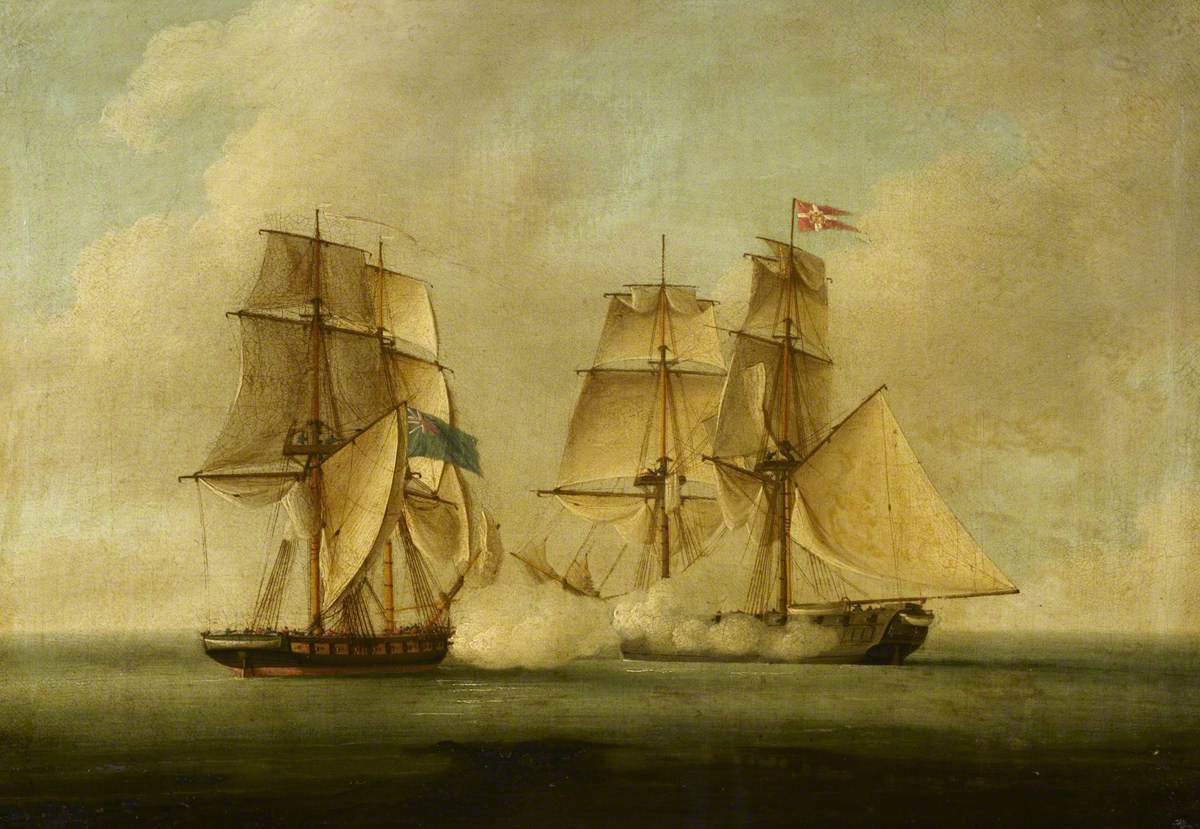
HMS Sappho capturing the Danish brig Admiral Jawl, Francis Sartorius

In 1807, while Jørgensen was visiting his family, he witnessed the Battle of Copenhagen and soon afterwards was given command of a small Danish vessel, Admiral Juel. In 1808 he engaged in a sea battle with HMS Sappho; the British captured Admiral Juel and treated Jørgensen as a privateer.

=== Protector of Iceland ===
Flag of Jørgen Jørgensen

In 1809, while on parole, he suggested to a merchant that a voyage to Iceland could be profitable as the island was suffering from food shortages at the time, due to the Danish monopoly on Icelandic trade. Jørgensen accompanied the voyage of the Clarence as an interpreter. That voyage failed to trade any goods as the ship was British and by that time Denmark-Norway and the United Kingdom of Great Britain and Ireland were at war. Soon after, Jørgensen sailed on a second voyage. On arrival in Iceland the ship's crew found the Danish-Norwegian Governor, Count of Trampe, would still not permit trading. With the help of other crew members, Jørgensen managed to arrest the governor and proclaimed himself 'Protector', promising that he would reinstate the Althing as soon as the Icelandic people were able to govern themselves. His intent was to establish a liberal society in the spirit of those emerging in the Americas and Europe at the time. With the arrival of HMS Talbot two months later, Danish government was restored and Jørgensen was taken back to England and tried by the Transport Board, who found him guilty of breaking his parole while a prisoner-of-war. He was released in 1811.

=== Later adventures ===
Jørgensen spent the next few years in London, where he began to drink heavily and gamble compulsively, building up substantial debts which eventually led to his conviction and incarceration. When released from prison in 1812, he travelled to Spain, Portugal, and Gibraltar and upon his return to England was again imprisoned when his creditors caught up with him. Following correspondence with the British Foreign Office, Jørgensen was recruited into the intelligence service, where he translated documents and travelled throughout France and Germany as a spy as the Napoleonic Wars drew to a close. In 1815, Jørgensen witnessed the Battle of Waterloo. While he was never involved in the battle, he was situated relatively close to some of the action. Upon returning to England, Jørgensen continued to write various reports, papers and articles but after being accused of theft in 1820, was imprisoned in Newgate Prison, released, and sent back there when he failed to leave Britain (a condition of his parole). A sentence of death was commuted thanks to the actions of a prominent friend and he spent another three years in Newgate before he was transported to Australia in 1825 on board Woodman.

After five months at sea, Jørgensen arrived back in Tasmania in 1826. In 1827, after he helped prevent the circulation of forged treasury bills, a group of local merchants headed by Anthony Fenn Kemp petitioned the governor for Jørgensen to be granted a ticket of leave. Jørgensen led several explorations of Tasmania, and was employed by the Van Diemen's Land Council as a Constable, taking part in the 'Black Line' Aboriginal clearance exercise. Jørgensen obtained a free pardon in 1835 but remained in Tasmania. He married an Irish convict, Norah Corbett, in 1831 and died in the Colonial Hospital on 20 January 1841.

Icelanders refer to Jørgensen as Jörundur hundadagakonungur ("Jørgen the Dog-Days King"), a reference to the time when the dog star is in the sky.

== Publications ==
- Efterretninger om Englændernes og Nordamerikanernes Fart og Handel paa Sydhavet (Intelligence on the English and North Anmreican's Travel and Trade on the Sourgh See), Copenhagen 1807
- The Copenhagen Expedition Traced to Other Causes than the Treaty of Tilsit; with Observations on the History and Present State of Denmark by a Dane, London 1811
- State of Christianity in the Island of Otaheite, and a Defence of the Pure Precepts of the Gospel, against Modern Antichrists, with Reasons for the Ill Success which Attends Christian Missionaries in their Attempts to Convert the Heathens, by a Foreign Traveller, Reading 1811
- Travels through France and Germany in the Years 1815, 1816 & 1817. Comprising a View of the Moral, Political, and Social State of those Countries. Interspersed with Numerous Historical and Political Anecdotes, Derived from Authentic Sources, London 1817
- The Religion of Christ is the Religion of Nature. Written in the Condemned Cells of Newgate. By Jorgen Jorgenson, Late Governor of Iceland, London 1827.
- ”History of the Origin, Rise, and Progress of the Van Diemen's Land Company” Six articles published in the Colonial Advocate, and Tasmanian Monthly Review and Register, Hobart 1828, a revised version was published in London in 1829 and republished in 1979.
- Observations on the Funded System; Containing a Summary View of the Present Political State of Great Britain, and the Relative Situation in which the Colony of Van Diemen's Land Stands towards the Mother Country, Hobart 1831
- An Address to the Free Colonists of Van Diemen's Land, on Trial by Jury, and our Other Constitutional Rights, Hobart 1834
- ”A Shred of Autobiography, Containing Various Anecdotes, Personal and Historical, Connected with these Colonies” Published in The Hobart Town Almanack in 1835 and 1838.

Posthumously:

- ”Aboriginal Languages in Tasmania” in Tasmanian Journal of Natural Science, Agriculture, Statistics, etc. Tasmanian Government Printer Hobart & John Murray, London 1842
- Letter from Jürgensen dated September 11, 1835 to his brother Frederik (Fritz) Jürgensen. Published in Personalhistorisk Tidsskrift 9. rk., I. bind 1928, Copenhagen 1929, ss. 82-89.

== In literature ==
- Flanagan, Richard Gould's Book of Fish (2002)
- Hogan, J F The Convict King (1891)
- Clarke, Marcus Old Tales of a Young Country (1871)
- Clune, Frank and Stephensen, P R The Viking of Van Diemen's Land (1954)
- Magris, Claudio Alla cieca (2006)
- Plomley, N J B Jorgen Jorgenson and the Aborigines of Van Diemen's Land (1991)
- Richards, Rhys, Jorgen Jorgenson’s Observations on Pacific Trade, and Sealing and Whaling in Australian and New Zealand Waters before 1805, Wellington, Paremata Press, 1996.
- Sprod, Dan, The Usurper: Jorgen Jorgenson and His Turbulent Life in Iceland and Van Diemen’s Land, 1780-1841, Hobart, Blubber Head Press, 2001.
- Stockwin, Julian Persephone (2017)
- Davies, Rhys Sea urchin: Adventures of Jorgen Jorgensen (1940)

== See also ==
- List of convicts transported to Australia

== Citations ==
Political offices
Preceded by Frederich Trampe as Governor of Iceland	Protector of Iceland; 26 June 1809 – 22 August 1809	Succeeded by Frederich Trampe as Governor of Iceland
