= Action of 2 March 1808 =

- Part of the Gunboat War
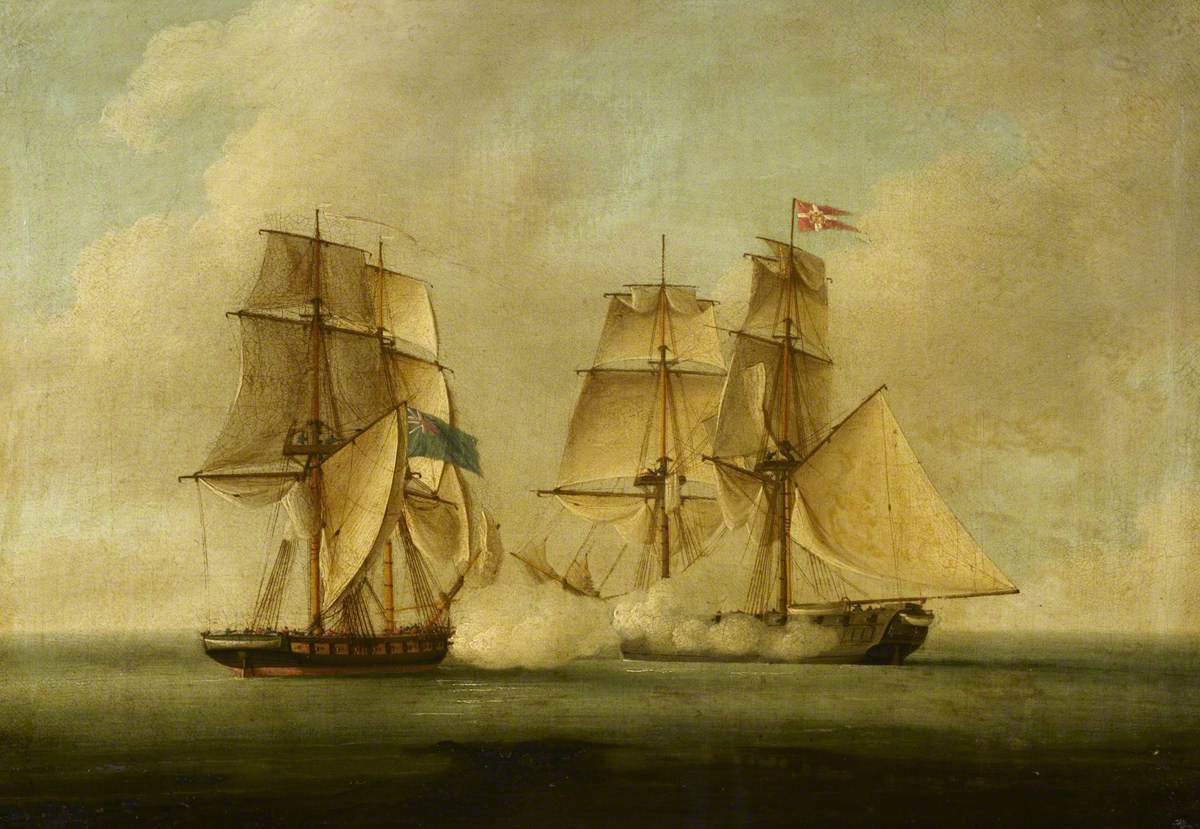
- Painting of the action by Francis Sartorius Jr.
Date	2 March 1808
Location	Off Scarborough, North Sea
Result	British victory

Belligerents
United Kingdom	Denmark–Norway

Commanders and leaders
George Langford	Jørgen Jørgensen (surrendered)

Strength
1 brig-sloop	1 brig

Casualties and losses
2 wounded	1 killed 2 wounded 1 brig captured

The action of 2 March 1808 was a minor naval battle between the Royal Navy's 18-gun Cruizer-class brig-sloop HMS Sappho, and the 28-gun, Danish two-decker brig Admiral Juel, during the Gunboat War. Sappho, under the command of Captain George Langford, discovered and chased Admiral Juel, which was steering a course to intercept several merchant vessels to leeward. After a short engagement Sappho captured Admiral Juel, commanded by Jørgen Jørgensen.

Admiral Juel, appears in references under a variety of names including Admiral Yawl, Admiral Yorol and Admiral Juul. No ship of this name is recorded as having been commissioned in the Royal Dano-Norwegian Navy (nor by her previous French name of Christine Henrietta), although four ships of more modern time have been named for Niels Juel who was an admiral in the late seventeenth century. The ship Admiral Juel in this engagement was a privateer. Her commander Jørgen Jørgensen (or Jürgensen) is not included in Topsøe-Jensen's work on Danish Naval officers, or in Project Runeberg/DBL.

== Background ==
On 2 March, Sappho was cruising off Scarborough when she discovered an armed brig that was steering a course as if intending to cut off several merchant vessels to leeward. Sappho gave chase and at about 13:30 hours fired a shot over the brig, which was showing British colours. Substituting Danish for British colours, which she had previously hoisted to deceive Sappho, the Danish vessel responded by firing her broadside. Her captain, George Langford, immediately bore down and brought what turned out to be the privateer Admiral Juel to close action. The engagement lasted about half an hour before Admiral Juel struck her colours.

== Battle ==
Sappho carried sixteen 32-pounder carronades and two 6-pounder guns, manned by a crew of 120 men and boys. Admiral Juel was a brig, but unusual in that she had her armament on two decks; on her first or lower deck, she had twelve 18-pounder carronades and on her second, or principal deck, she carried sixteen 6-pounder guns. Her crew consisted of 83 men and boys. The weight of the broadsides favored Sappho at 262 pounds versus 156 pounds for Admiral Juel, as did the relative size of the crews. In the engagement, Sappho had one man wounded and one man injured. Admiral Juel had two dead: her second officer and a seaman. As a result of the action, Langford received promotion to post-captain, and in 1847 the Admiralty issued the Naval General Service Medal with the clasp "Sappho 2 March 1808" to all surviving claimants from the action.

== Aftermath ==
The Danish captain was the colourful and erratic adventurer Jørgen Jørgensen, who in 1801 had been a member of the crew, and perhaps second in command, of Lady Nelson. On Lady Nelson, he participated in at least one voyage of exploration along the coast of Australia. In his autobiography, he states that his father joined seven other merchants from Copenhagen jointly to purchase Admiral Juel and present it to the Danish Crown. The Government commissioned, manned, and armed Admiral Juel. (Note: It is not clear from this account whether she was a privateer or a naval vessel. Danish references - see Admiral Juel (1807 Danish Ship) - clearly define her as a privateer) Jorgenson reported that by cutting through the ice a month before it was expected that any vessel could get out, he was able to come unawares among the British traders and capture eight or nine merchant vessels before Sappho put an end to his cruise.
