= Kristín Bjarnadóttir =

Icelandic politician (1812–1891)

Kristín Bjarnadóttir (1812 – 1891) was an Icelandic politician.

She was active as a midwife in Kjalarneshreppur, and founded and managed a café at Lækjargata and later a textile shop.

In 1882, she voted in the municipal election in Reykjavik. As such she became the first woman to vote on Iceland after women (if unmarried, widows and meeting the financial requirements) were formally granted municipal suffrage.

In 1888, she became the first woman in Iceland to be elected to a city council (in Reykjavik).
