= Ísleifur Einarsson =

Icelandic judge and politician

Ísleifur Einarsson (21 May 1765 – 23 July 1836) was an Icelandic magistrate who served as joint Governor of Iceland (1810–1813), alongside Johan Carl Thuerecht von Castenschiold, Rasmus Frydensberg and Stefán Þórarinsson.
