= Ehrenreich Christopher Ludvig Moltke =

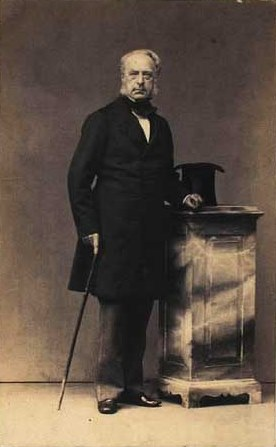
Ehrenreich Christopher Ludvig Moltke

Ehrenreich Christopher Ludvig Moltke (18 June 1790 – 10 August 1864) was a Danish civil servant and nobleman who served as Governor of Iceland (1819–1823).

Moltke was born in Roskilde to an old German-Danish aristocracy, his father Werner Moltke was then governor of Roskilde county. He graduated with a law degree from the University of Copenhagen in 1816.
