= Stefán Þórarinsson =

Icelandic magistrate and lawyer (1754–1823)

Stefán Þórarinsson (24 August 1754 – 12 March 1823) was an Icelandic magistrate, lawyer and politician who served as joint Governor of Iceland (1810–1813), alongside Johan Carl Thuerecht von Castenschiold, Rasmus Frydensberg and Ísleifur Einarsson.
