= Rasmus Frydensberg =

Danish politician

Rasmus Frydensberg was a Danish politician who served as joint Governor of Iceland (1810–1813), alongside Johan Carl Thuerecht von Castenschiold, Stefán Þórarinsson and Ísleifur Einarsson.

Frydensberg was also the police chief of the Icelandic Police following Reykjavík commissioning the first formal police force in 1803.
