= Frederich Christopher Trampe, Count of Trampe =

Dano-Norwegian Politician, Count of Trampe (died 1832)

Frederich Christopher Trampe
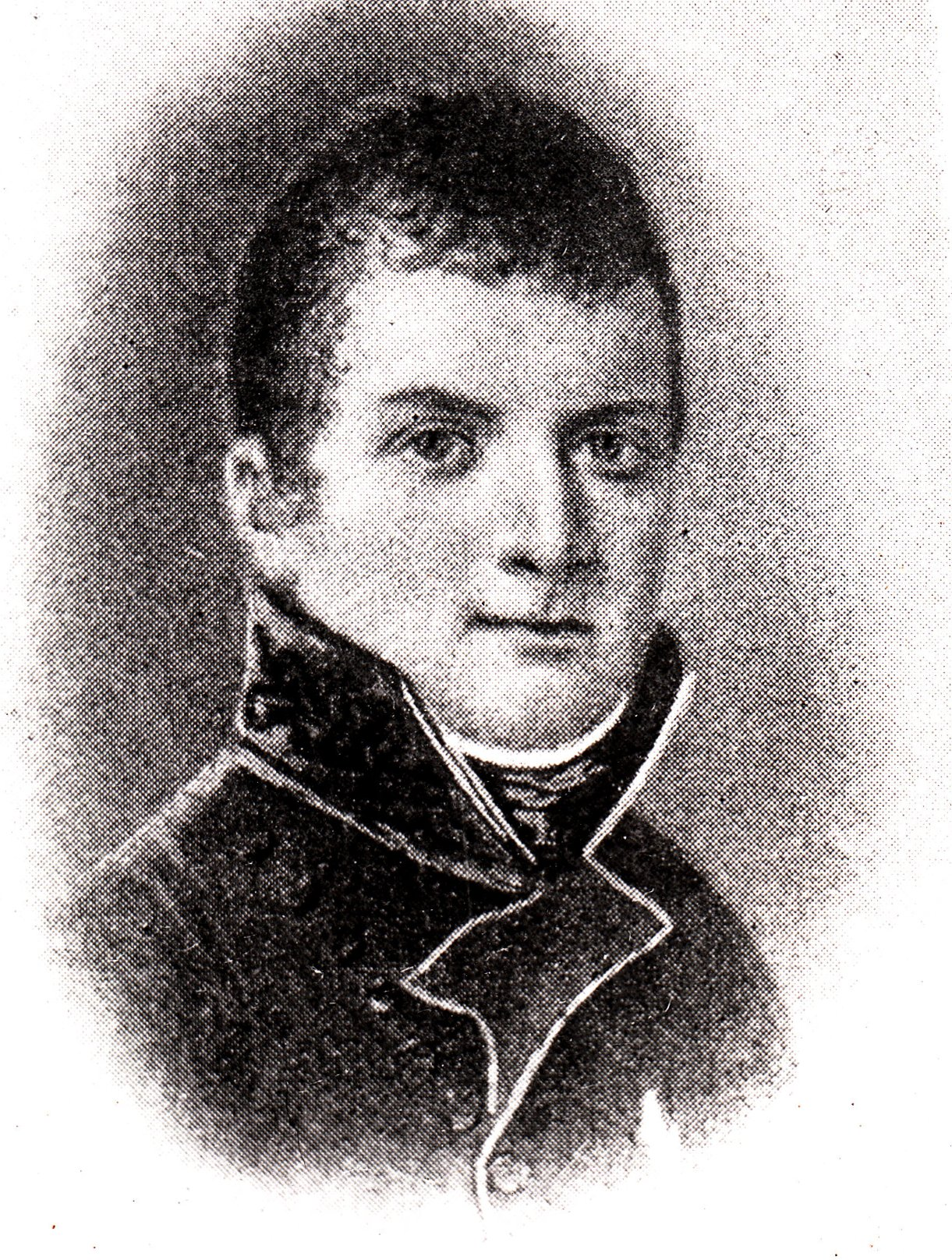

Personal details
- Born: Frederich Christopher Trampe; 19 June 1779 Krabbesholm, Denmark–Norway
- Died: 18 July 1832 (aged 53) Trondheim, Sweden-Norway
- Occupation: civil servant

Frederich Christopher, Count of Trampe (19 June 1779 – 18 July 1832) was a Dano-Norwegian count, civil servant and politician.

== Biography ==
Trampe was born in Krabbesholm, Jutland, Denmark. His parents were Adam Frederich, Count of Trampe (1750-1807) and Gertrud Hoffmand de Poulson (1746–1815). Frederich's father belonged to an originally Pomeranian noble family, whose noble status had been naturalised in Denmark and Norway.

Frederik Trampe was enrolled at the University of Copenhagen in 1794 and graduated as a cand.jur. in 1798. He became enrolled at the University of Kiel during 1801 and awarded Ph.D. in 1804.

He became deputy judge at Lolland and Falster from 1800, before making a brief military career in the Danish Army. He served as Governor of Iceland from 1804 until 1809, when he was overthrown by Jørgen Jørgensen. In 1810 he came to Norway as County Governor of Søndre Trondhjems amt (now Sør-Trøndelag). He held this position until his death in 1832.

In Trondhjem (now Trondheim) he was a member of the Royal Norwegian Society of Sciences and Letters, serving as praeses in 1832 right before his death. He was a Knight of the Order of the Dannebrog in 1811, Knight of the Order of the Polar Star in 1818, and Commander of the Order of the Polar Star in 1825.

== Personal life ==
Trampe was married three times: in 1797 to Sophie Frederikke Heinrich (1764–1807); in 1808 to Anna Dorothea Colbjørnsen (1792–1808), who died just five months after the wedding; and in 1810, with Amalia Ulrica Frederike Schmettau (1790–1856).

He was the father of several children, including Adam Johan Frederik Poulsen Trampe, Count of Trampe (1798–1876) who served as County Governor of Nordlands amt and of Nordre Trondhjems amt.

Trampe died in Rotvoll, Trondheim and was buried at Lade Church.

== See also ==
- Danish nobility
- Norwegian nobility

== Literature and sources ==
- Frederik Christopher Trampe Store norske leksikon
- Frederik Trampe Norsk biografisk leksikon

Civic offices
Preceded by Erik Must Angell	County Governor of Søndre Trondhjem; 1810–1832	Succeeded by Fredrik Riis
Academic offices
Preceded by Niels Stockfleth Schultz	Praeses of the Royal Norwegian Society of Sciences and Letters; 1832	Succeeded by Christian Hersleb Hornemann
