= Johan Carl Thuerecht von Castenschiold =

Johan Carl Thuerecht von Castenschiold (14 June 1787 – 30 January 1844) was a Danish civil servant and nobleman who served as Governor of Iceland (1813–1819).

== Early life and education ==
Castenschiold was born in Skælskør to Joachim Melchior Holten Castenschiold and Elisabeth Gysbertsdatter Behagen. His father's family had descended from planter in the Danish West Indies Johan Lorentz Castenschiold. His maternal grandfather was the merchant Fysbert Behagen. He earned a law degree from the University of Copenhagen in 1806. In 1804, he had become a court page (hofunker).

== Career ==
Castenschiold worked at Rentekammeret from 1807. In 1808, he became a kammerjunker. In 1810, he was appointed county governor of Iceland Southern County (Islands Søndre Amt). In 1815–1819, he was Diocesan governor (stiftsamtmand) of the entire island.

In 1821, he was appointed acting Diocesan governor of Ribe in Jutland. On 16 May 1824, he was appointed chamberlain. On 16 November 1822, he was appointed real Diocesan governor of Ribe and county governor of Ribe County. On 1 October 1828, he was appointed Diocesan governor of Aalborg and county governor of Aalborg County. In July 1836, he was appointed Diocesan governor of Funen and county governor of Odense County. He retired on 21 December 1842.

== Personal life ==
On 23 August 1823, Castenschiold married Frederikke Vilhelmine Louise, countess Lüttichau (1797–1836). She was the daughter of Frederik Christian Tonne Lüttichau and his second wife Karen Benzon. He died on 1 December 1830.
