= Governor of Iceland =

The Governor of Iceland was a position established by the Government of Denmark in 1684 that existed until 1872.

In 1871, the Stöðulög bill was introduced, in which the new office of "Land-Chief of Iceland" replaced the governor. This official was to run the country according to orders from Denmark. Finsen, being the most recent Governor was chosen to hold the position, beginning his duties on 1 April 1873.

== List of Governors of Iceland ==
- Ulrik Christian Gyldenløve (1684–1719)
- Peter Raben (1719–1727)
- Christian Gyldencrone (1728–1730)
- Henrik Ochsen (1730–1750)
- Otto von Rantzau (1750–1768)
- Christian von Proeck (1768–1769)
- Lauritz Andreas Thodal (1770–1785)
- Hans Christoph Diederich Victor von Levetzow (1785–1789)
- Ólafur Stefánsson (1790–1806)
- Frederich Christopher Trampe, Count of Trampe (1806–1810)
- Ísleifur Einarsson, Johan Carl Thuerecht von Castenschiold, Rasmus Frydensberg and Stefán Þórarinsson (1810–1813)
- Johan Carl Thuerecht von Castenschiold (1813–1819)
- Ehrenreich Christopher Ludvig Moltke (1819–1823)
- Peter Fjeldsted Hoppe (1824–1829)
- Lorentz Angel Krieger (1829–1836)
- Carl Emil Bardenfleth (1837–1841)
- Torkil Abraham Hoppe (1841–1847)
- Matthias Hans Rosenørn (1847–1849)
- Jørgen Ditlev Trampe (1850–1860)
- Þórður Jónassen (1860–1865)
- Hilmar Finsen (1865–1872)
