= List of people on the postage stamps of Iceland =

This is a list of people on the postage stamps of Iceland including the years when they appeared on a stamp.

== Danish dependency (until 1918) ==
- 1902 Christian IX of Denmark
- 1907 Overlapping profiles of Christian IX and Frederick VIII of Denmark
- 1911 Jón Sigurðsson 100th anniversary of his birth.
- 1912 Frederick VIII of Denmark

== Kingdom of Iceland (1918–1944) ==
- 1920 King Christian X (the only official King of Iceland (1918–1944)(as Kristján X))
- 1935 Matthias Jochumsson
- 1937 King Christian X
- 1941 Snorri Sturluson 700th Anniversary of the Death (3 stamps issued 17th Nov. 1941)

== Iceland a republic (from 1944) ==
- 1950 Bishop Jón Arason 400th Anniversary of Death (2 stamps issued 7th Nov. 1950)
- 1954 Hannes Hafstein 50th Anniversary of Appointment as First Native Minister of Iceland. (3 stamps issued 1 June 1954)
- 1957 Jónas Hallgrímsson 150th Anniversary of Birth (issued 16th Nov. 1957)
- 1959 Jón Þorkelsson Bicentenary of his death (2 stamps issued 5 May 1959)
- 1961 Benedikt Sveinsson and Björn M. Ólsen, to celebrate the University of Iceland (3 stamps issued 6th Oct)
- 1961 Jón Sigurðsson 150th anniversary of his birth.
- 1963 Sigurður Guðmundsson to celebrate the National Museum (2 stamps issued 20th Feb. 1963)
- 1965 Einar Benediktsson (Stamp issued 16th Nov. 1965)
- 1968 Friðrik Friðriksson (Stamp issued 5th Sept. 1968)
- 1968 Jón Magnússon (politician), 50th Anniversary of Independence, (2 stamps issued 1st Dec. 1968)
- 1970 Grimur Thomsen (poet) 150th Anniversary of Birth (Stamp issued 19 June 1970)
- 1971 Tryggvi Gunnarsson To celebrate the centenary of the Patriotic Society 1871-1971 (2 stamps issued 19th Aug. 1971)
- 1975 Hallgrímur Pétursson (poet), Árni Magnússon, Einar Jónsson and Jón Eiríksson (1728-1787) Set of 4 stamps on "Celebrities" (issued 18th Sept. 1975)
- 1975 Bertel Thorvaldsen Celebrating the centenary of the Thorvaldsen Society (Stamp issued 19th Nov. 1975)
- 1978 Halldór Hermannsson
- 1979 Jón Sigurðsson and Ingibjörg Einarsdóttir Centenary of both of their deaths (Stamp issued 1st Nov. 1979)
- 1980 Jón Sveinsson (Nonni) and Gunnar Gunnarsson writers (2 Stamps issued 28 April 1980)
- 1982 Þorbjörg Sveinsdóttir a famous Icelander (Stamp issued 8th Sept. 1982)
- 1983 Kristján Eldjárn
- 1987 Rasmus Kristjan Rask to mark his birth Centenary
- 1999 Composer Jón Leifs
- 2002 Halldór Laxness
- 2002 Sesselja Sigmundsdottir Advocate for Mentally Handicapped founder of Sólheimar
- 2004 Hannes Hafstein
- 2007 Jónas Hallgrímsson 200th anniversary of his birth.
- 2007 Frederick VIII of Denmark Royal Visit of 1907
- 2011 Jón Sigurðsson 200th anniversary of his birth.

== See also ==
Postage stamps and postal history of Iceland

== Sources ==
- Mclean, BM Stamp Dealer Stamp Member of the A.D.P.S. - U.K. Stamp Dealers Society and Member of the I.P.D.A. - Internet Philatelic Dealers Association.
- J Smith and Associates
