= Racism in Iceland =

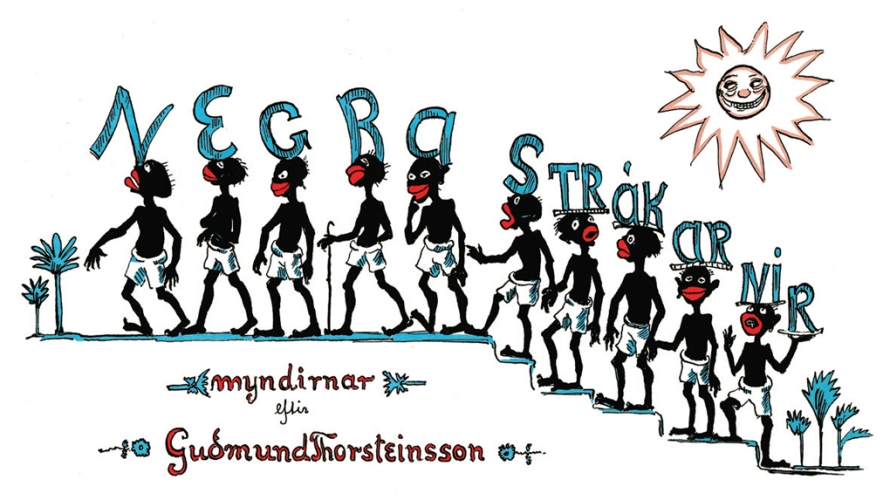
Cover of "Negrastrákarnir", an Icelandic version of the song Ten Little Indians published in 1922

Racism in Iceland commonly targets immigrants, particularly non-white or non-Western immigrants. Iceland is a historically homogeneous society with little ethnic or racial diversity. Icelandic national identity is often racialized as a white identity, therefore non-white people are frequently otherized as non-Icelandic. Muslim and Jewish minorities in Iceland also experience Islamophobia and antisemitism. According to the Icelandic Human Rights Centre, "hidden" racism is common in Iceland despite violent or overt expressions of racism being uncommon.

== Anti-Indigenous racism ==
Iceland is the only Nordic country that has never had an Indigenous population, as Iceland was uninhabited before it was populated by Norse settlers and some Celtic settlers.

Iceland has endorsed the joint Nordic statement at the UN Permanent Forum on Indigenous Issues. The statement endorses "respect for the Inuit and Sami Peoples' right to self-determination" in the Nordic region.

== Icelandic nationalism ==
Some critics allege that Icelandic nationalism sometimes has racist and antisemitic elements, a legacy of hostility towards Black and Jewish people within 19th-century nationalist discourse.

== Icelandic relationship to Danish colonialism ==
In Danish-ruled Iceland, some Icelandic people participated in Danish colonialism against Black and Asian people. In the 17th century, the Icelander Jón Ólafsson visited Africa and India during his time working for the Danish East Indian Company. The Icelander Árni from Geitarstekk sailed on Danish ships to various locations, including China and Russia.

According to University of Iceland professor Kristín Loftsdóttir, Icelanders have an historical duality as both a colonized people and as colonizers. Loftsdóttir has written that Icelandic settlers participated in settler-colonialism of Indigenous lands in the Americas and that during the push for independence Icelandic nationalists would sometimes "implicitly and explicitly refer to other colonized populations and accept the racist discourse of the time". Icelandic people who supported independence for Iceland often argued that Icelanders deserved independence as part of the community of "civilized" European countries, but were not necessarily supportive of independence for colonized populations elsewhere in the world.

== Nazism ==
Some adherents of Ásatrúarfélagið (commonly known as Ásatrú) have expressed a racist version of Icelandic paganism that promotes neo-Nazism and white supremacy. Hilmar Örn Hilmarsson, the chief of the Ásatrú Society, has denounced racists and white supremacists within the religion. According to the Southern Poverty Law Center, the founders of Ásatrú "avoided racist interpretations of its Eurocentric cosmology" and that Ásatrú adherents in the United States are more likely to adopt racist versions of the religion compared to their Icelandic coreligionists.

== Xenophobia ==
As immigration to Iceland has increased in the 21st century, racism and xenophobia have increased. Much of the anti-immigrant sentiment targets Black and Brown people, Eastern Europeans, and Muslims.

In 2010, the Social Science Research Institute at the University of Iceland conducted a study regarding the depiction of Polish immigrants in Icelandic media. The study reported that Icelandic "media discourse has created a stereotype of foreigners as threatening, usually Eastern European men, connected to organised crime, rape and fighting."

== Freedom of religion ==
Proposals to ban circumcision in Iceland have been denounced by the Jewish and Muslim communities as an attack on freedom of religion. The Icelandic government has cited parity as the reason for the measure. "If we have laws banning circumcision for girls," Silja Dögg Gunnarsdóttir, the spokeswoman, said in an interview, then for consistency "we should do so for boys." The bill adapts the existing law banning FGC, changing "girls" to "children".

== Antisemitism ==
In 1853, Iceland's parliament, the Alþingi, rejected a request by the Danish king to implement the Danish law allowing foreign Jews to reside in the country. Two years later the parliament told the king that the law would be applied to Iceland and that both Danish and foreign Jews were welcome. The Alþingi said that the Jews were enterprising merchants who did not try to lure others to their religion. However, no Jew is known to have accepted this offer.

Since 1943, state broadcaster RÚV has annually broadcast Hallgrímur Pétursson's Passion Hymns during Lent, a tradition initiated at the urging of Sigurbjörn Einarsson. For each of the fifty days leading up to Easter, an Icelander reads one verse of the hymns. In 2012, Rabbi Abraham Cooper of the Simon Wiesenthal Center attempted and failed to stop this practice, arguing that their many negative references to Jews reinforced antisemitic hatred. However, RÚV director Páll Magnússon rejected the request, telling Cooper to "bear in mind that the hymns are written 350 years ago and they describe the poet's feelings about events that supposedly took place around 2000 years ago." Vilhjálmur Örn Vilhjálmsson has commented that the episode revealed that "no Icelandic researcher on Pétursson's poetry had ever considered whether the Passiusalmar were perhaps not a uniquely Icelandic phenomenon," but representative of European antisemitism prevalent at the time of their writing.

== Islamophobia ==
In 2014, there was controversy over Saudi Arabian funding for the Reykjavík Mosque. The Icelandic President, Ólafur Ragnar Grímsson, expressed fear that Saudi funding could help encourage Islamic extremism in Iceland. Critics alleged that Grímsson's comments were Islamophobic.

== Anti-Black racism ==
A 1922 Icelandic version of the song Ten Little Indians was titled "Negrastrákarnir" and featured racist caricatures of Black people. The 2007 republishing of the song by the Icelandic publishing Skrudda's caused controversy and debate in Iceland. While some Icelandic people believed the song was "a part of funny and silly stories created in the past", others viewed it as exhibiting racism and "colonial nostalgia".

The archaic Icelandic word "negri" was widely considered socially acceptable until the 1970s, but is now considered a racial slur similar to the N-word.

African Americans living in Iceland have organized an Icelandic wing of the global Black Lives Matter movement. Demonstrations were held in Reykjavík and Ísafjörður.

The Fader and others have criticized the Icelandic singer Björk for casual racism because she has said that "sound is the nigger of the world" and "audio is the nigger of the world".

== See also ==
- Icelandic nationalism
- Nordicism
- Norse colonization of North America
- Nordic colonialism
- Racism in Denmark
- Racism in Norway
