= Brynjólfur Pétursson =

Icelandic lawyer, nationalist and government official

Brynjólfur Pétursson (15 April 1810 – 18 October 1851) was an Icelandic lawyer and government official. He was one of the Fjölnismenn, a group of Icelandic intellectuals who spearheaded the revival of Icelandic national consciousness and gave rise to the Icelandic Independence Movement.

== Personal life ==
Brynjólfur was born in Víðivellir in Skagafjörður and was one of the "Víðvellir brothers", the sons of profast Pétur Pétursson and his second wife, Þóra Brynjólfsdóttir. His brothers were Jón Pétursson, a judge, and Pétur Pétursson, a bishop.

Brynjólfur died an unmarried man in Copenhagen in 1851, leaving no children.

== Education and career ==
Brynjólfur graduated from Bessastaðir in 1828 and attained a degree in jurisprudence from the University of Copenhagen in 1837. He then became a Danish government official, working in the Danish ministry of finance. He became chief administrator at the Iceland office in Copenhagen following the abolition of absolutism in Denmark in 1848, and a representative for Iceland in the Danish constitutional assembly 1848–1849.

In his student years, Brynjólfur was one of the Fjölnismenn along with Jónas Hallgrímsson, Konráð Gíslason and Tómas Sæmundsson. He was on the board of the Copenhagen branch of the Icelandic Literary Society, and president of the society 1848–1851.

== See also ==
- List of Icelandic writers
- Icelandic literature

== Sources ==
- Candidati juris. Tímarit hinsi íslenzka bókmenntafélags, 3. árgangur 1882.
