= Ný félagsrit =

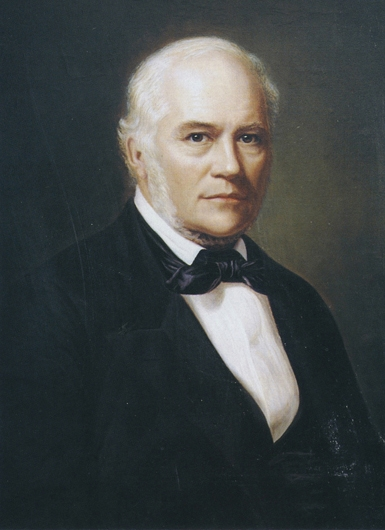
Jón Sigurðsson

Ný félagsrit was a periodical, the main objective of which was to present Jón Sigurðsson's views on Icelandic independence to the Icelandic people. It was published annually in the periods 1841–1864 and 1869–1873, as well as being published in 1867. In total, there were 30 volumes, mostly written by Sigurðsson himself.

== See also ==
- Fjölnir (journal)
