= Konráð Gíslason =

Icelandic grammarian and philologist (1808–1891)

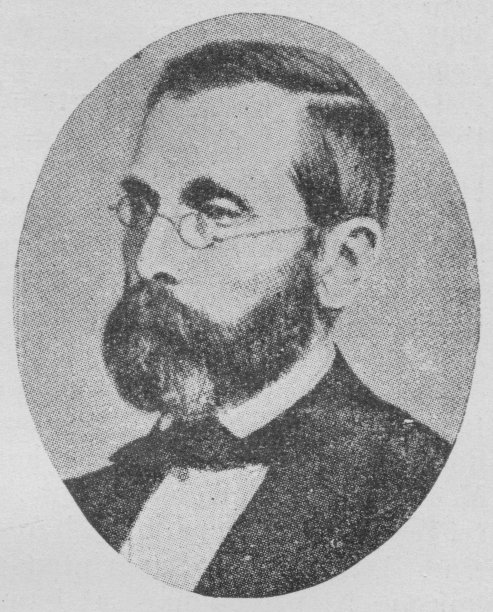
- no later than 1891
- Born: Konráð Gíslason; July 3, 1808; Langamýri, Skagafjörður, Iceland
- Died: January 4, 1891 (aged 82); Copenhagen, Denmark
- Occupations: Grammarian, philologist
- Known for: Member of the Fjölnismenn; pioneer of Icelandic philology

Konráð Gíslason (3 July 1808 – 4 January 1891) was an Icelandic grammarian and philologist, and one of the Fjölnismenn, a group of Icelandic intellectuals who spearheaded the revival of Icelandic national consciousness in the 19th century. He was by royal appointment member of the 1849 Danish Constituent Assembly.

== Early life ==
Konráð was born in Langamýri in Skagafjörður, Iceland. He was the oldest child of chronicler Gísli Konráðsson and his wife Efemía Benediktsdóttir. In his early years he was instructed in Danish, arithmetic and Latin by pastor Jón Konráðsson and his daughter, but otherwise received no formal schooling, herding sheep on his father's farm.

At the age of 17 Konráð travelled south to seek employment in the fisheries, and worked in Álftanes over the summer as a manual labourer for Hallgrímur Scheving, a teacher at the Bessastaðir school. Soon Hallgrímur called on his young employee to assist him in philological analysis of medieval Icelandic texts and taught him Latin. Konráð proved a gifted pupil and Hallgrímur obtained a stipend for him to study at Bessastaðir.

In 1831, Konráð finished his education at Bessastaðir and travelled to Denmark to study at the University of Copenhagen. He initially studied jurisprudence but soon abandoned the law to focus on Nordic and Icelandic philology.

Jónas Hallgrímsson, Brynjólfur Pétursson and Tómas Sæmundsson had been his fellow students at both Bessastaðir and the University of Copenhagen. In 1834, the four of them—collectively known as the Fjölnismenn—founded the Icelandic journal Fjölnir and published the first issue in the following year. Later, in 1847, Konráð and Brynjólfur were the first to publish the poems of Jónas Hallgrímsson.

== Academic work ==
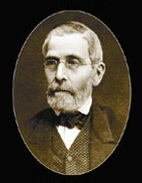
Konráð Gíslason

Konráð wanted to adapt Icelandic spelling to actual pronunciation and introduced a new system of Icelandic spelling in the second copy of Fjölnir. However, his ideas never caught on and he would later abandon the project. In 1839 he received a grant from the Arnamagnæan Institute and spent the following years working on a Danish-Icelandic dictionary alongside research into the Icelandic language. Konráð's contributions to the development of Icelandic as a written language were extensive.

Konráð was a pioneer in the field of Icelandic dictionaries, publishing a Danish-Icelandic dictionary in 1851. He also contributed to an Icelandic-English dictionary by Richard Cleasby and Guðbrandur Vigfússon. He studied Old Icelandic and was the first scholar to distinguish Old Icelandic from Modern Icelandic in his seminal work Um frumparta íslenzkrar túngu í fornöld (English: "On the constituent parts of the Icelandic tongue in ancient times") (1846).

Konráð also published several Old Icelandic texts, among them Njáls saga, in conjunction with the society Det nordiske Literatur-Samfund (English: The Nordic Literature Foundation) and Veraldar saga. His publications of the Icelandic sagas did much to introduce medieval Icelandic literature to the Danish reading public.

In 1846 he was granted a teaching position at the Learned School of Reykjavik, which he later declined, having been promised a lectureship in Nordic philology at the University of Copenhagen. He was granted this position in 1848 and was made full professor in 1853, a position which he held until 1886.

== Personal life ==
Konráð's Danish fiancée died in 1846, shortly before the intended date of their wedding, leaving him grief-stricken. Nine years later he married her widowed sister and the two lived together until her death in 1877. She had a mentally handicapped son from her previous marriage, whom Konráð is said to have treated kindly.

He is often referred to as "the last of the Fjölnismenn", in reference to the fact that he was the only one of the four who did not die at a young age. Konráð was known as a stubborn and difficult man, and in later life he grew gradually more isolated from the Icelandic community in Copenhagen.

In his will, Konráð stipulated that all his property, including his books and medieval manuscripts, should be donated to the Arnamagnæan Institute.

== Sources ==
- Aðalgeir Kristjánsson, Bréf Konráðs Gíslasonar (Stofnun Árna Magnússonar, 1984)
- Æfiágrip Gísla sagnfræðings Konráðssonar, ritað af honum sjálfum
- Konráð Gíslason síðasti Fjölnismaðurinn
