= Postage stamps and postal history of Iceland =

Regular mail service in Iceland was first established by a charter of 13 May 1776, and on 1 January 1873, Iceland issued its first postage stamps. The design was the same as for the Danish numeral issue of the time (numeral of value surmounted by a crown all inside an oval), denominated with values ranging from 2 to 16 skilling, and inscribed ÍSLAND. All are scarce or rare, and used copies are especially hard to find.

== Chronology ==
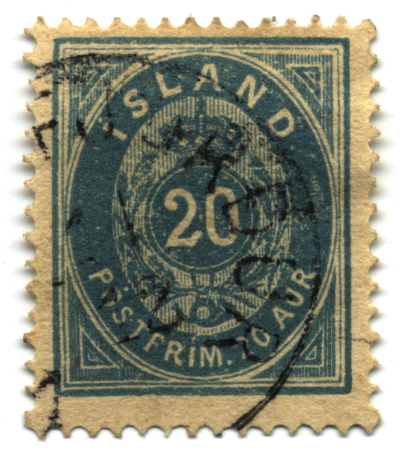
20 aurar, 1882 (used at Vopnafjörður?)

In 1876 the currency changed to eyrir (pl. aurar) and króna. This meant new stamps, which were issued beginning in August. The same basic design, with some changes of color and perforation, continued in use through 1901. In 1897 a shortage of 3-aurar stamps led to the overprinting of 5-aurur stamps with þrir or þrir / 3; these are rare, and unfortunately excellent counterfeits have been produced.

In 1902 the numeral stamps were officially withdrawn and declared invalid for postage, since a new set depicting King Christian IX was to be issued. But then the Minister of Iceland changed his mind for reasons which are still unclear and had the numerals reissued, overprinted Í GILDI / '02--'03 in red or black, the overprint indicating that they were still valid. While some of the overprints are common, costing the collector less than one US dollar or one euro, others are among the great rarities of Icelandic philately. There are also many inverts and typographical errors to be found.

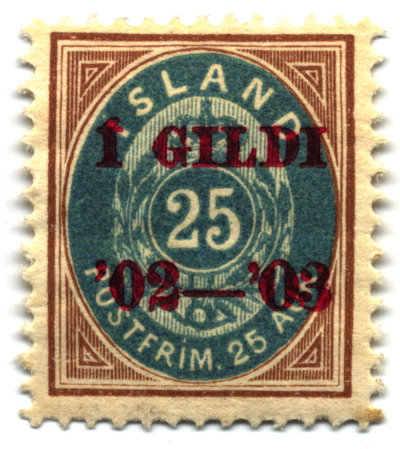
25 aurar "Í Gildi", 1902

In 1906 King Christian died, and so in 1907 a new series of stamps came out, featuring overlapping profiles of Christian IX and King Frederik VIII.

1911 saw Iceland's first commemorative stamps, a set honoring Jón Sigurðsson, the leader of Iceland's independence movement in the 19th century, on the 100th anniversary of his birth. In February of the following year, a set was issued with Frederick's silhouette. Although Frederick died in May 1912, no new stamps were issued until 1915, when another set of the 1907 design was issued in new colors.

King Christian X first appeared on Icelandic stamps in a new set of 1920. Periodic stamp shortages plagued the postal service during the 1920s, and locally surcharged stamps were produced in 1921, 1922, 1924, 1925, 1926, 1929, and 1930. The first pictorial, non-portrait stamps were issued in 1925, a set of five showing views of Iceland. Iceland's first airmail stamp was issued in 1928; it was produced by overprinting a crude image of an airplane on a regular 10-aurar stamp.

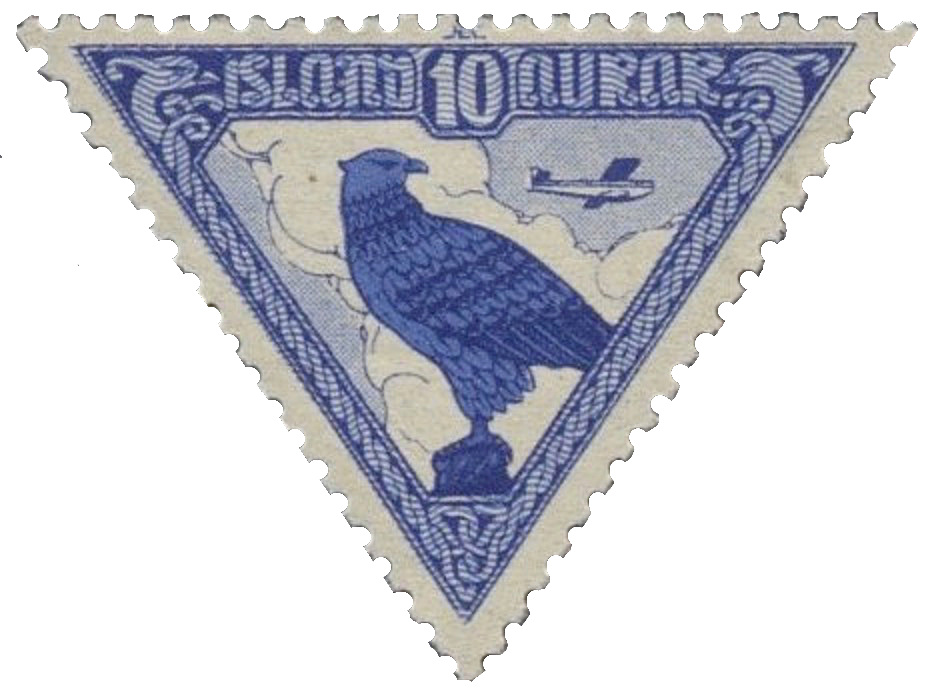
Icelandic 10 Aur stamp from 1930 - The 1000th Anniversary of the Althing

In 1930, Iceland celebrated the 1000th anniversary of the Althing with an attractive series of 15 regular and 5 airmail stamps featuring a wide variety of historical, mythological, and scenic images. In 1928 Icelandic authorities received a proposal from the 'Society of the Friends of Iceland' Verein der Islandsfreunde in Vienna Austria, proposing to produce these stamps as a gift to Iceland for the Millenary celebrations. Against the advice of the Head Postmaster, Sigurður Briem, the Icelandic government accepted the offer to produce 813,000 kronur's worth of stamps, 600,000 kronur's worth of which were to go to Iceland, and the rest to the Society for its trouble. Iceland's share of the stamps were delivered in December 1929, but in 1930 it became apparent that a fraud had been committed and a much larger than authorised number of stamps had been produced, by the insertion of the figure '1' before the total face value of the stamps to be produced in the print order. Police investigations had not been completed before the outbreak of World War II, and were not resumed afterwards.

In May 1931, stamps were overprinted Zeppelin / 1931 for use on mail sent via the airship Graf Zeppelin, which visited Reykjavík on 1 July. The zeppelin did not actually land, but it got low enough to pass mail bags up and down.

Also in 1931, a new issue came out depicting the Gullfoss waterfall. In addition, stamps of the 1920 issue, but with the vignette of the king much more finely engraved, started appearing periodically, through 1937.

Iceland's first semi-postal stamps appeared in 1933. The subjects of the three stamps depicted categories of recipients; rescue workers, children, and the elderly.

Hekla eruption of 1947 on Icelandic 25-aurar stamp of 1948

In 1938 a dramatic series featured images of Geysir, the namesake of all other geysers.

Iceland again honored Jón Sigurðsson on its issue marking the independent republic established on 17 June 1944 (and again on the 150th anniversary of his birth on 17 June 1961 and the centenary of the deaths of Jón and his wife, Ingibjorg Einarsdóttir, in 1979).

In 1948, the eruption of the volcano Hekla was marked by another set of dramatic images.

After independence, Iceland pursued a relatively restrained stamp-issuing policy, bringing out about 20 new stamps each year. There were annual Christmas and Europa issues, and sets depicting local scenery, flora, and fauna, as well as heritage and the works of local artists.

Iceland Post announced in 2020 that it would cease issuing stamps. The postal service said that it would continue to sell its stamps in stock to customers and may reprint older stamps if necessary to replenish its stock. Nevertheless, in 2023, Iceland Post released a souvenir sheet consisting of four stamps in order to commemorate the 150th anniversary of the country's first postage stamp.

== See also ==
- List of people on stamps of Iceland

== Sources ==
- Stanley Gibbons Ltd: various catalogues
- Encyclopaedia of Postal Authorities
- Rossiter, Stuart & John Flower. The Stamp Atlas. London: Macdonald, 1986. ISBN 0-356-10862-7
