= Icelandic nationalism =

Political ideology in Iceland

Flag of Iceland

Þjóðernishyggja is the Icelandic term for nationalism; nationmindedness is a rough translation of the term. Its use was instrumental in the Icelandic movement for independence from Denmark, led by Jón Sigurðsson.

Icelandic nationalism or Þjóðernishyggja is based upon the idea of resurrection of the Icelandic Free State, and its values (or what was believed to be its values): democracy, freedom of the individual, the need for the country to be independent, and respect for the cultural and religious traditions, especially the long preserved language. These ideas are often encoded in the popular phrase land, þjóð og tunga ('land, people, and language'). Historically, Icelanders have seen their current republic to be the reincarnation of the old Free State, and thus Icelandic nationalism today is based upon preserving what was gained by the independence movement. Thus Icelandic nationalist sentiment, having some aspects of civic and ethnic nationalism, is highly respectful of democratic parliamentary powers (see resurrected Althing) and skeptical of foreign control over Iceland, which is partly responsible for there being little will in Iceland for joining the European Union.

Icelandic nationalism primarily arose in the 19th century, during a time when it was under Danish hegemony. It arose not only due to pride in Iceland's achievements in the Middle Ages and a desire to embrace Icelandic cultural peculiarities, but also in reaction towards the increasing economic liberalism of the Danish government and thus a defense of Icelandic peasant life. One towering figure was Jón Sigurðsson, who was the preeminent figure of Icelandic nationalism in the 19th century and on whose birthday, 17 June 1944, the modern Icelandic republic intentionally declared independence.

Some critics allege that Icelandic nationalism sometimes has racist and antisemitic elements, a legacy of hostility towards Black and Jewish people within 19th-century nationalist discourse. According to University of Iceland professor Kristín Loftsdóttir, Icelanders have an historical duality as both a colonized people and as colonizers. Loftsdóttir has written that during the push for independence, Icelandic nationalists would sometimes "implicitly and explicitly refer to other colonized populations and accept the racist discourse of the time". Icelandic people who supported independence for Iceland often argued that Icelanders deserved independence as part of the community of "civilized" European countries, but were not necessarily supportive of independence for colonized populations elsewhere in the world.

== List of Icelandic nationalist parties ==
- Icelandic National Front

== See also ==
- Racism in Iceland
