= Land, þjóð og tunga =

Icelandic nationalistic phrase

Land, þjóð og tunga (rendered by Gaston Dorren as 'land, folk and tongue' and by Finnur Friðriksson as 'country, nation, language') is an important phrase in Icelandic nationalism. It encapsulates the concept that these three factors (which might be broadly be glossed as geography, genes, and culture) define Iceland as a nation-state. The phrase is particularly noted for the prominence it gives to language in defining Icelandicness, which is not present in all other nationalisms.

== History ==
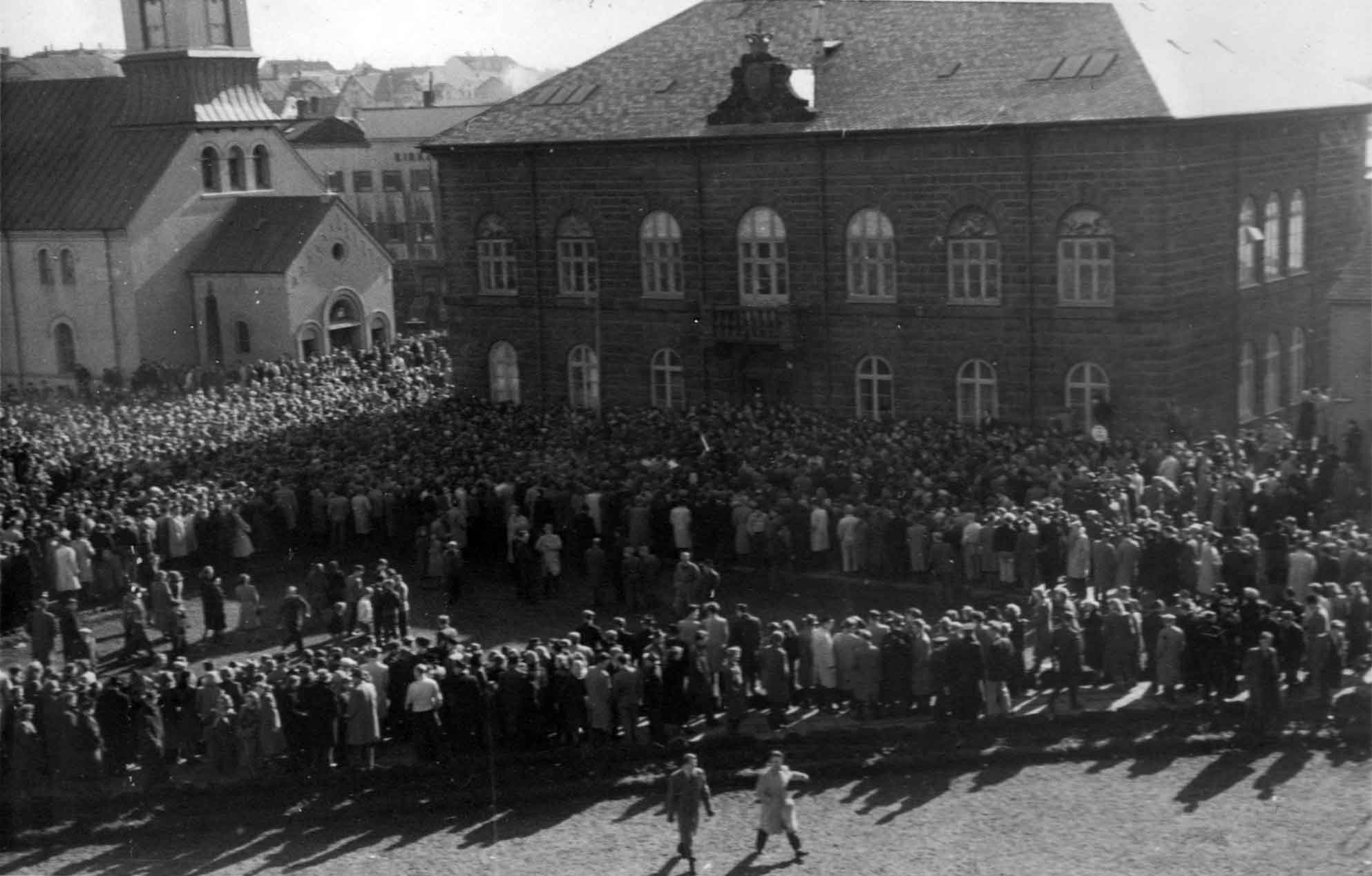
View over Austurvöllur and the House of the Althing, March 30th 1949.

The phrase seems to be first attested in Icelandic-language newspapers in the 1930s (though possibly first in a Canadian-Icelandic publication, the Winnipeg-based newspaper Heimskringla). The phrase seems to have been particularly popular in the 1950s, in the wake of Icelandic independence, but remains in widespread use, not least by Vigdís Finnbogadóttir (president of Iceland 1980–96).

However, the most famous instance of the phrase comes in a widely reprinted sonnet by Snorri Hjartason, first published in Tímarit Máls og menningar in the spring of 1949 under the title 'Land þjóð og tunga' but later also printed under the title 'Marz 1949' ('March 1949') in reference to the 1949 anti-NATO riot in Iceland. The first quatrain runs:

Land þjóð og tunga, þrenning sönn og ein,
þér var ég gefinn barn á móðurkné;
ég lék hjá þér við læk og blóm og stein,
þú leiddir mig í orðs þíns háu vé.

Translation:

Land, people, and language, trinity holy and one,
I was given to you as a child on my mother's knee;
I played beside you by stream and flower and stone,
you led me into the high temple of your word.

(Unlike you, which can be singular or plural, the Icelandic word þú used in the poem is the second person singular, emphasising the unity of the land, people, and language.)

While Snorri's opening line can be read quite metaphorically, some scholarship and political commentary has taken it quite literally, even seeing its allusion to the Holy Trinity as supporting the centrality of the Church of Iceland to Icelandic identity.

Recent research has noted that in the twenty-first century the validity of land, þjóð og tunga as a way of defining the Icelandic nation is increasingly open to question as Iceland becomes a multi-racial and multi-lingual society.
