= Fljótshlíð =

Rural area in southern Iceland

Coordinates: 63°43′35″N 19°56′15″W

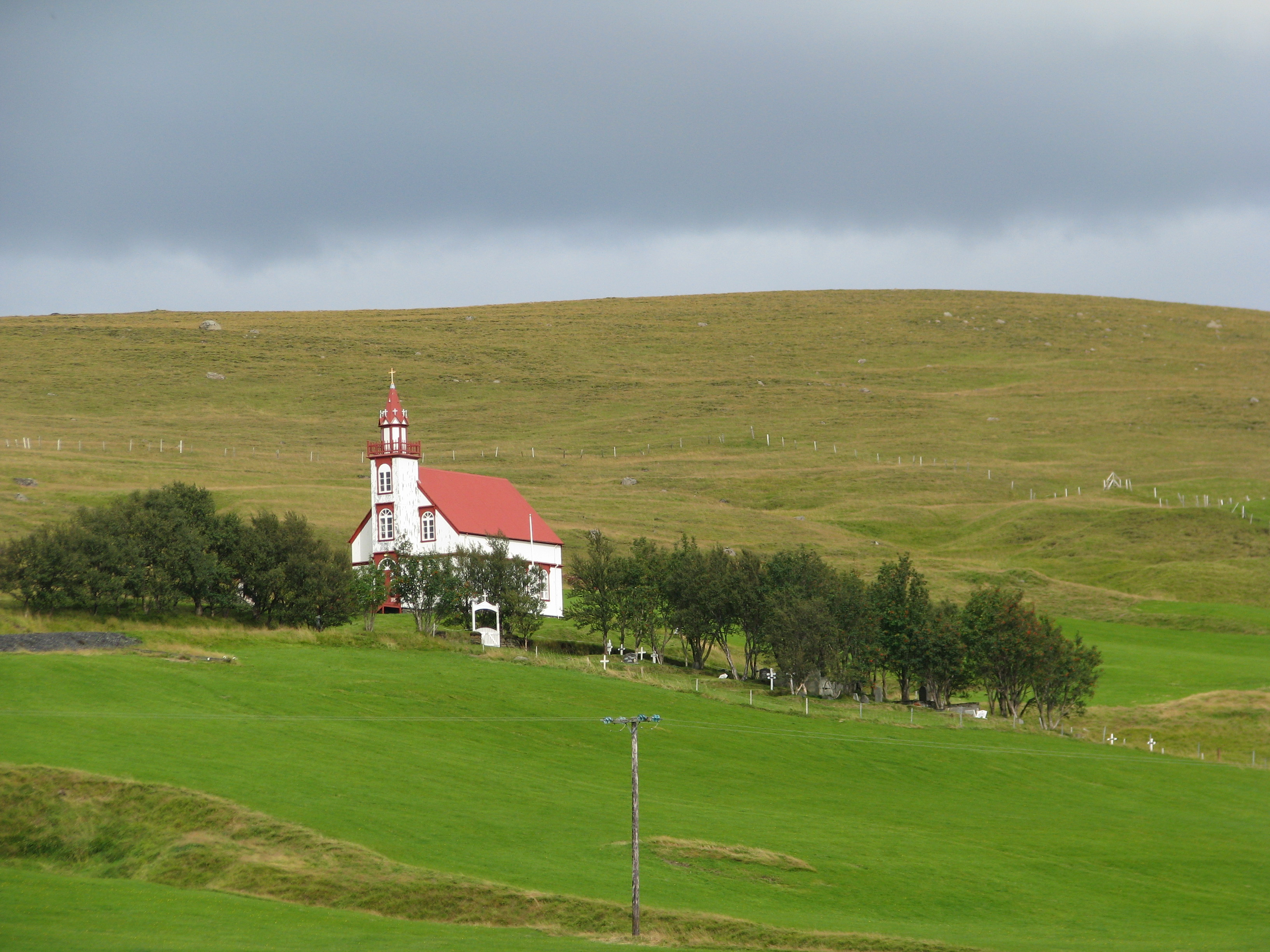
A church at Hlíðarendi in Fljótshlíð

Fljótshlíð (Icelandic pronunciation: [ˈfljoutsˌl̥iːθ]) is a rural area in the municipality of Rangárþing eystra in Southern Region, Iceland. Before the formation of Rangárþing eystra in 2002, Fljótshlíð was its own municipality called Fljótshlíðarhreppur. Fljót (genitive case: fljóts) means "river", and hlíð means "slope". Fljótshlíð lies to the east of Hvolsvöllur and north of the Markarfljót river. Gunnar Hámundarson lived in the area in the 10th century. Other notable inhabitants include Tómas Sæmundsson, editor of Fjölnir, artist Nína Sæmundsson and poet Þorsteinn Erlingsson.

Fljótshlíð was evacuated as a result of the 2010 eruptions of Eyjafjallajökull.

Fljótshlíð is also where the band Retro Stefson shot a video for the 'Inspired by Iceland' concert series.
