= Icelandic Literary Society =

The Icelandic Literary Society (Icelandic: Hið Íslenzka Bókmenntafélag), founded in 1816, is an organization dedicated to promoting and strengthening Icelandic language, literature and learning.

The society was founded in 1816, when the Icelandic independence movement was in its infancy, at the instigation of Rasmus Rask and Árni Helgason. Its stated purpose was "to support and maintain the Icelandic language and literature, and the civilization and honor of the Icelandic nation, by the publication of books or by other means as circumstances would permit." The first meeting of the Copenhagen branch was held on 13 April 1816, and the first meeting of the Reykjavík branch on 1 August 1816.

Rask was the first president of the Copenhagen branch; the first president of the Reykjavík branch (until 1848) was Árni Helgason. Jón Sigurðsson, an Icelandic cultural hero, served as president of the Copenhagen branch from 1851 to 1879. In 1912 the two branches were united and Björn M. Ólsen, president of the Reykjavík branch, continued as president of the whole society.

The first book the society published contained Sturlunga saga together with Saga Árna biskups Þorlákssonar, in 1817. The Icelandic branch published its first book in 1849. Since 1970, the society has published Icelandic translations of key non-Icelandic academic and literary works, in a series titled Lærdómsrit hins íslenska bókmenntafélags which was initiated by the society's then president, Sigurður Líndal, and Þorsteinn Gylfason, who served as its editor in chief until 1992. The one hundredth book in the series was a translation of Rainer Maria Rilke's novel The Notebooks of Malte Laurids Brigge.

The society publishes the magazine Skírnir, which succeeded its first annual, Íslenzk Sagnablöð, in 1827, and also acts as distributor for the Íslenzk fornrit series (publications of the Old Icelandic Text Society).

The society's bicentenary was celebrated in 2016 with an exhibition at the National Library.
