= Björn M. Ólsen =

Icelandic scholar and politician

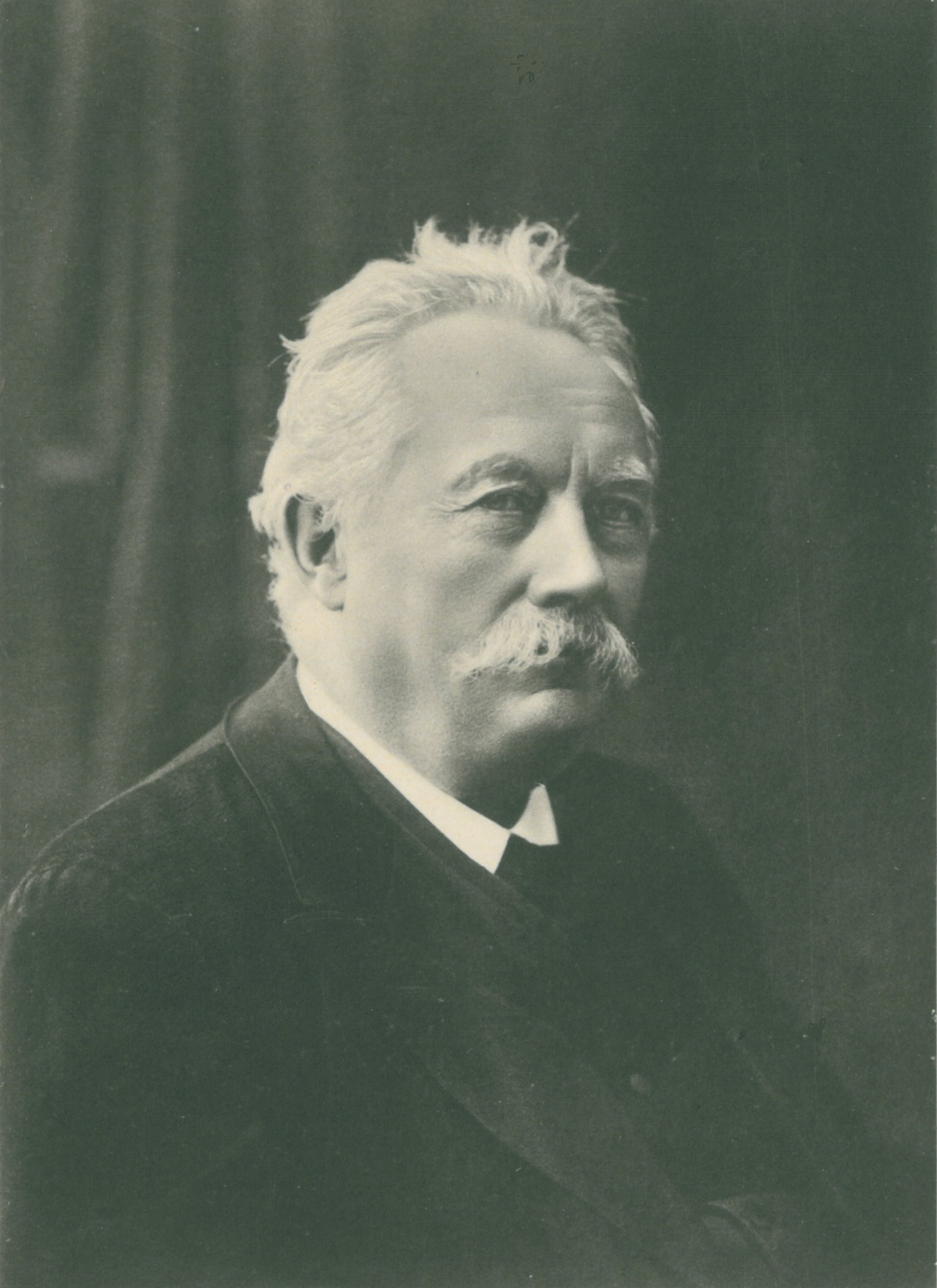
Björn M. Ólsen, about 1900

Björn Magnússon Ólsen (14 July 1850 – 16 January 1919) was an Icelandic scholar and politician. He was a member of the Alþingi, the first rector of the University of Iceland, and a professor of Icelandic language and culture there.

== Life and career ==
Björn M. Ólsen was born in the farming community of Þingeyrar in Austur-Húnavatnssýsla. His father, Magnús R. Ólsen (1810–1860), represented the district in the Alþingi; his mother was Ingunn Jónsdóttir Ólsen (1817–1897). He finished at the Reykjavík School in 1869, and after a break in his studies due to poor health went to Copenhagen in 1872 and in spring 1877 earned his master's degree in language and history from the University of Copenhagen. In 1878 he made a study trip to Italy and Greece with the help of public funds. He later earned a doctorate from the University of Copenhagen, in 1883 with a thesis on the runes.

In 1879 he became an adjunct teacher at the Reykjavík School; in summer 1895 he became rector there. In spring 1904 he retired from that job and was at the same time given the title of professor; he then began to devote his time primarily to studying Icelandic literature and history. That was the year Iceland achieved home rule, and it is likely that increasing national scholarship in these areas seemed like a duty.

He was a member of the Alþingi under the King of Denmark from 1905 to 1908, representing the Home Rule Party in the government of Hannes Hafstein. When the University of Iceland was founded in 1911 he became Professor of Icelandic there, and also served as the first rector, from 1911 to 1912. He was awarded honorary doctorates by the University of Christiania in 1911 and by the University of Iceland on 17 June 1918. He was president of the Icelandic Literary Society in 1894–1900 and 1909–1918; the Reykjavík and Copenhagen branches were combined in Iceland during his tenure. From 1895 to 1919 he was on the distribution committee for the Jón Sigurðsson bequest. He was an honorary member of the Royal Danish Academy of Sciences and Letters and other learned societies.

He wrote many papers on Icelandic literature and history. Finnur Jónsson stated in an obituary that his best works were his studies of Sturlunga saga and of Landnámabók, but that his articles on Gunnlaugs saga and on Snorri Sturluson as author of Egils saga were also noteworthy. He also wrote two articles positing Icelandic origins for the Eddic poems, "Hvar eru Eddu-kvæðin til orðin?" and "Svar til dis Finns Jónssonar", and studies of the conversion of Iceland and its submission to the Norwegian king.

He retired from his professorship on 3 July 1918, six months before his death. He never married.

== Selected publications ==
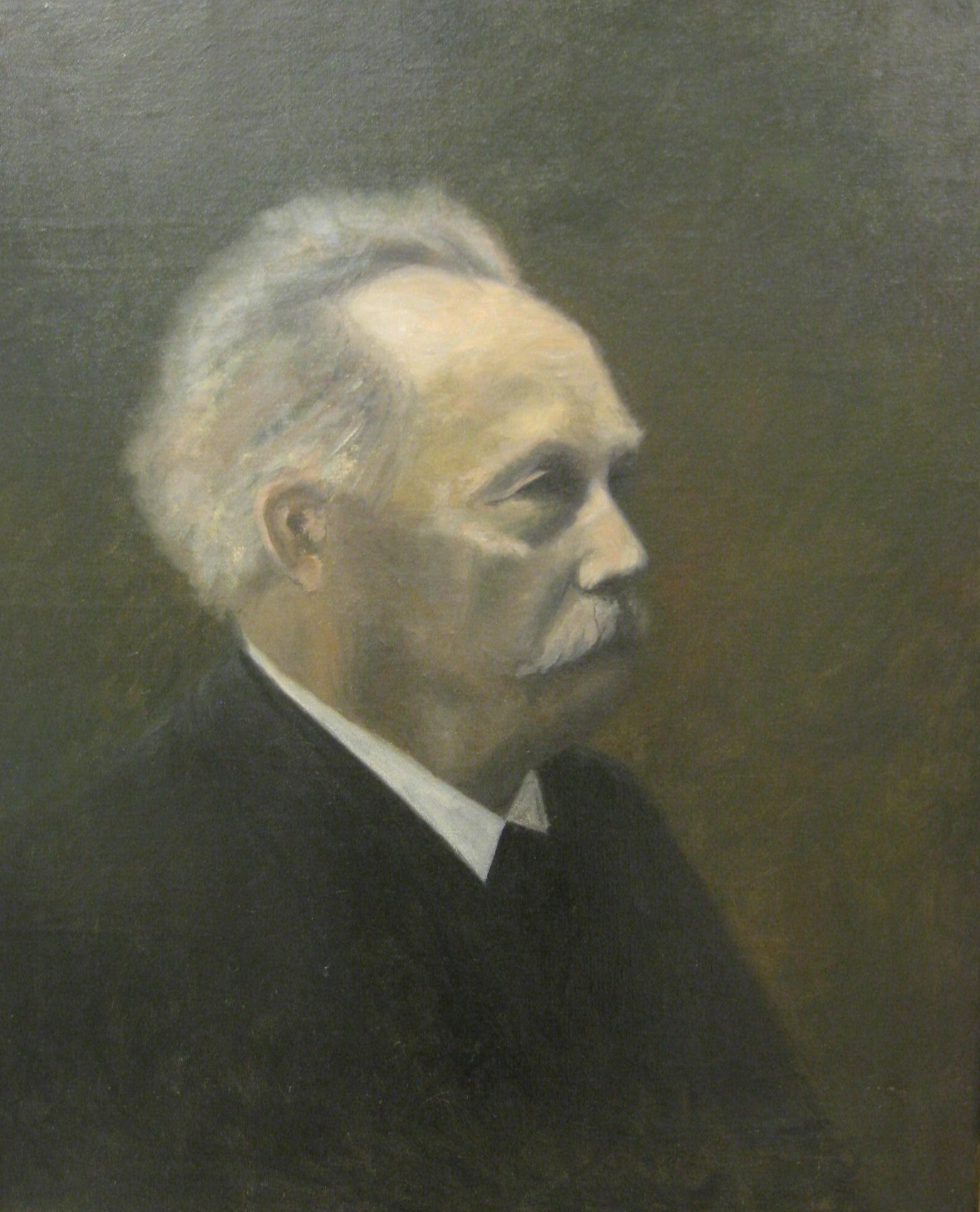
Portrait of Björn M. Ólsen by Þórarinn Þorláksson

=== Books and extended articles ===
- "Runerne i den oldislandske literatur". Doctoral thesis, University of Copenhagen, 1883.
- Rasmus Kristján Rask 1787–1887: Minningarrit. Reykjavík: Icelandic Literary Society, 1887.
- Um kristnitökuna árið 1000 og tildrög hennar. Reykjavík, 1900.
- "Um Sturlunga sögu". Safn til sögu Íslands og íslenskra bókmennta 3 (1902–04) 193–510.
- "Om Gunnlaugs saga ormstungu. En kritisk undersøgelse". Royal Danish Academy of Sciences and Letters, 1911.
- Sólarljóð. Edition. Reykjavík: Hið íslenska bókmenntafélag, 1915. (pdf online at Septentrionalia.net)
- "Um Íslendinga sögur, kaflar úr háskólafyrirlestrum". Safn til sögu Íslands 6 (1937–39).

=== Articles ===
- "Er Snorri Sturluson höfundur Egils sögu?" Skírnir 1905, 363–68.
- "Landnáma og Egils saga". Aarbøger for nordisk Oldkyndighed og Historie 1904, 167–247.
- "Landnáma og Eyrbyggja saga". Aarbøger for nordisk Oldkyndighed og Historie 1905.
- "Landnáma og Hænsa-Þóris saga". Aarbøger for nordisk Oldkyndighed og Historie 1905, 63–80.
- "Landnáma og Laxdæla saga". Aarbøger for nordisk Oldkyndighed og Historie 1908.
- "Landnáma og Gull-Þóris (Þorskfirðinga) saga". Aarbøger for nordisk Oldkyndighed og Historie 1910, 35–61.
- "Landnámas oprindelige disposition og Landnáma og Eiríks saga rauða". Aarbøger for nordisk Oldkyndighed og Historie 1920, 283–307.
- "Um kornirkju á Íslandi að fornu". Búnaðarrit 1910.
- "Um silfurverð og vaðmálsverð, sérstaklega á landnámsöld Íslands". Skírnir 1910, 1–18.
