= Sólarljóð =

The Sólarljóð (The Song of the Sun) is an Old Norse poem, written in Iceland ca 1200. It is written in the traditional metric style of the Poetic Edda, but with content from Christian visionary poems.

The poem is anonymous, even though it is in some manuscripts assigned to Sæmund. In 82 ljóðaháttr stanzas it gives a narrative, in which a deceased father is addressing his son from another world. The father doesn't reveal his identity until the last stanzas.

The title of the poem is given in stanza 81, and no doubt derives from the allusion to the Sun at the beginning of the stanzas 39–45, all beginning with Sól ek sá ... "The Sun I saw ...". The first stanzas (1-24) give examples of the lives, death and fate of different, anonymous persons. Stanzas 25-32 are advice, similar to those in Hávamál, while 33-38 is a "psychological biography" of the narrator's life. No 39-45 are the sun stanzas; followed by a section (46-56) where the narrator is placed in some limbo between life and death. The next section, stanzas 57–80, describes his impressions of Hell and Heaven, often compared to The Divine Comedy. The last two stanzas are addressing the son, and the hope for resurrection.

Though written in the traditional metric style of the old Norse religious and wisdom poetry, the poem draws heavily on inspiration from European medieval visionary literature and the metaphors of contemporary Christian literature. Despite its references to Norse mythology, it bears no signs of syncretism, but bears a convinced testimony of the Christian religion.

== Excerpt ==
The two last stanzas in the edition of Ólafur Briem follow.

81. Kvæði þetta,
er þér kennt hefig,
skaltu fyr kvikum kveða:
Sólarljóð,
er sýnast munu
minnst að mörgu login.

82. Hér við skiljumst
og hittast munum
á feginsdegi fira;
drottinn minn
gefi dauðum ró,
en hinum líkn, er lifa.

== Editions ==
- Sophus Bugge (1867), Sólarljóð (Old Norse)
- Björn M. Ólsen (1915) Sólarljóð, pdf (Icelandic)
- Sólarljóð Guðni Jónsson's edition with normalized spelling (Old Norse)
- Bergmann, "Les Chants de Sol", Strasbourg & Paris, 1858.
