= Jónas Hallgrímsson =

Icelandic poet, author and naturalist

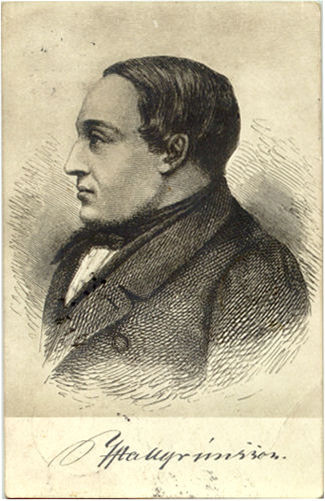
Portrait of Jónas Hallgrímsson

Jónas Hallgrímsson (16 November 1807 – 26 May 1845) was an Icelandic poet, writer and naturalist. He was one of the founders of the Icelandic journal Fjölnir, which was first published in Copenhagen in 1835. The magazine was used by Jónas and his fellow Fjölnismenn to promote Icelandic nationalism, in the hope of giving impetus to the Icelandic Independence Movement. Jónas remains one of Iceland's most beloved poets, penning some of the best-known Icelandic poems about Iceland and its people. Since 1996, Jónas's birthday has been officially recognised in Iceland as the Day of the Icelandic Language. On 16 November each year, the Jónas Hallgrímsson Award is awarded to an individual for their outstanding contribution to the Icelandic Language.

== Biography ==
Jónas was born in the north of Iceland, in Öxnadalur in Eyjafjörður. He was the son of Hallgrímur Þorsteinsson, a curate, and Rannveig Jónasdóttir. He was the third of their four children; his siblings were Þorsteinn (born 1800), Rannveig (born 1802) and Anna Margrét (born 1815). In 1816 Jónas' father drowned in a lake and Jónas was sent to live with his aunt. In 1821 he returned home to Öxnadalur to be confirmed, before going away to a school in Skagafjörður, where he was taught by the Reverend Einar H. Thorlacius. He studied there for two years, and won a scholarship to attend the school at Bessastaðir for a further six.

After passing his final examinations in 1829, Jónas moved to Reykjavík and was employed by a sheriff as a clerk, living in his home. During this time, he also worked as a defence lawyer. It is said that sometime in the winter of 1831–1832, Jónas proposed to a woman called Christiane Knudsen, but he was rejected. He was heartbroken.

In 1832 he sailed to Denmark, and passed the entrance exam for the University of Copenhagen. He began working for a law degree, but after four years switched to literature and natural sciences, excelling in both subjects. In 1835, along with fellow Icelandic students Brynjólfur Pétursson, Konráð Gíslason and Tómas Sæmundsson, he founded the patriotic journal Fjölnir.

After graduation he was awarded a grant from the state treasury to conduct scientific research in Iceland, a project which he worked on from 1839 to 1842. He continued to pursue his interest in the natural history of Iceland, and to work on Fjölnir throughout his life, dividing his time between Denmark and research trips to Iceland. It was in Fjölnir that many of his poems and essays first appeared. Jónas also worked as a translator of foreign material, including scientific works. In these can be found many of the Icelandic words coined by Jónas. One of these, for an example, is reikistjarna, meaning planet. This is a compound word from the verb að reika (to wander) and the noun stjarna (star).

On 21 May 1845 in Copenhagen, Jónas slipped on the stairs up to his room and broke his leg. He went to the hospital the next day, but died of blood poisoning, aged only 37.

== Style ==
Jónas is considered one of the founding fathers, and best examples, of romanticism in Iceland. The imagery in his poetry was strongly influenced by the Icelandic landscape. He is also known for introducing foreign metres, such as pentameter, to Icelandic poetry.

Charming and fair is the land,

and snow-white the peaks of the jokuls [glaciers],

Cloudless and blue is the sky,

the ocean is shimmering bright,

But high on the lave fields, where

still Osar river is flowing

Down into Almanna gorge,

Althing no longer is held,

Now Snorri's booth serves as a sheepfold,

the ling upon Logberg the sacred

Is blue with berries every year,

for children's and ravens' delight.

Oh, ye juvenile host

and full-grown manhood of Iceland!

Thus is our forefathers' fame

forgotten and dormant withal.

Iceland Translated by Gudmund J. Gislason Beck, Richard, editor, Icelandic Lyrics: Originals and Translations, Thorhallur Bjarnarson, Publisher, Post Box 1001, Reykjavik 1930

== Controversy over remains ==
In 1946, the bones of Jónas Hallgrímsson were moved from Copenhagen to Iceland in a controversy known in Icelandic as the beinamálið ('the case of the bones'). While ostensibly a national triumph, the reburial has been argued to have been an enormously problematic exercise in hegemony by Iceland's post-independence elites and "instead of uniting the nation, the episode uncovered a great divide within the people of Iceland". The main campaigner behind this was Sigurjón Pétursson, an admirer of Jónas who claimed to be in telepathic communication with the dead poet and wanted to re-bury his remains in Öxnadalur, where Jónas grew up. Sigurjón came up against serious opposition from a number of the political élite, including Ólafur Thors, who was then Prime Minister of Iceland. The government informed him that Jónas' bones were state property, and would be buried at the national burial ground at Þingvellir, alongside the poet Einar Benediktsson.

However, the government proved unwilling to finance the excavation and transportation. Sigurjón covered most of the cost, even paying for Matthías Þórðarson, the director of the National Museum, to oversee the excavation. The process was a lengthy one, because a father and son had been buried on top of Jónas in 1875, and another couple in 1900, and they needed to be excavated first.

Finally, Sigurjón was able to transport the remains to Iceland. He drove north with them, intending to bury them in Öxnadalur in defiance of the government, but the priests there refused to perform the rites. The coffin stood in a church for a week before being driven back south and buried in the government's chosen spot on 16 November, Jónas' birthday. Since 1996, the date has been celebrated in Iceland as Icelandic Language Day.

The controversy, its motivations and outcomes were satirised by, amongst others, Halldór Laxness's 1948 novel Atómstöðin and Milan Kundera's Ignorance.

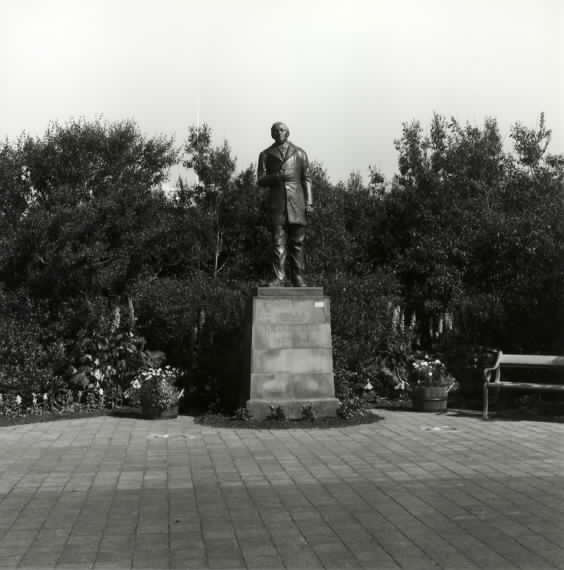
Statue of Jonas Hallgrimsson by Einar Jónsson

== Sources ==
- Jónas Hallgrímsson, Selected Poetry and Prose: The University of Wisconsin Digital Collections Center presents this publicly accessible digital resource. It includes a wide range of materials that introduce the work of Icelandic poet and natural scientist Jónas Hallgrímsson (1807–1845), generally acknowledged to be the most important and influential Icelandic poet of modern times.
- Jónas Hallgrímson.is (In Icelandic)
- Iacocca, V. K. (2021). Saga-Sites of Memory: Jónas Hallgrímsson, Icelandic Nationalism, and the Íslendingasögur. Scandinavian-Canadian Studies, 28, 260–289. https://doi.org/10.29173/scancan209
