= Íslandspóstur =

National postal service of Iceland

Iceland Post
- Native name: Íslandspóstur ohf.
- Formerly: Póstur og Sími
- Industry: Postal Service
- Founded: 1776 (foundation) 1873 (independent agency) 1935 (merger with Landssímí (Síminn)) 1998 (split from Síminn)
- Headquarters: Höfðabakki 9D, Reykjavík, Iceland
- Area served: Iceland
- Owner: Government of Iceland
- Number of employees: 580
- Website: posturinn.is

Íslandspóstur (Icelandic pronunciation: [ˈistlan(t)sˌpʰoustʏr], lit. 'Iceland Post') or simply Pósturinn ([ˈpʰoustʏrɪn], lit. 'The Post') is the national postal service of Iceland. It is wholly owned by the Icelandic Government. It dates back to the year 1776 when Christian VII, king of Denmark ordered a mail service to be established in the country. Its current form was established in 1998 following the split from the state telecom, Síminn.

Iceland Post is a member of the Universal Postal Union and the Small European Postal Administration Cooperation.

== History ==
Icelandic postal history dates back to the year 1776 when Christian VII, king of Denmark (and of Iceland at the time) ordered a mail service to be established in the country. Two years later, regular postal sailings began between Iceland and Denmark, once a year. The first Icelandic postage stamps were published in 1873, and at the same time, the Icelandic postal system was being organised under a special board and the first post offices being established.

=== First post office ===
In 1872, the first post office was opened at Austurvöllur square, in a timber structure located where Hotel Borg currently is. The street later became Pósthússtræti (namesake, lit. 'post office street') and the post office was at number 11. The first postmaster in Iceland was Óli Finsen, who held the role until his death. The first post office in Reykjavík was also referred to as Finsenshús, or Finsen's house. At this time, there was no home delivery of letters or parcels.

==== Move to Pósthússtræti 3 ====
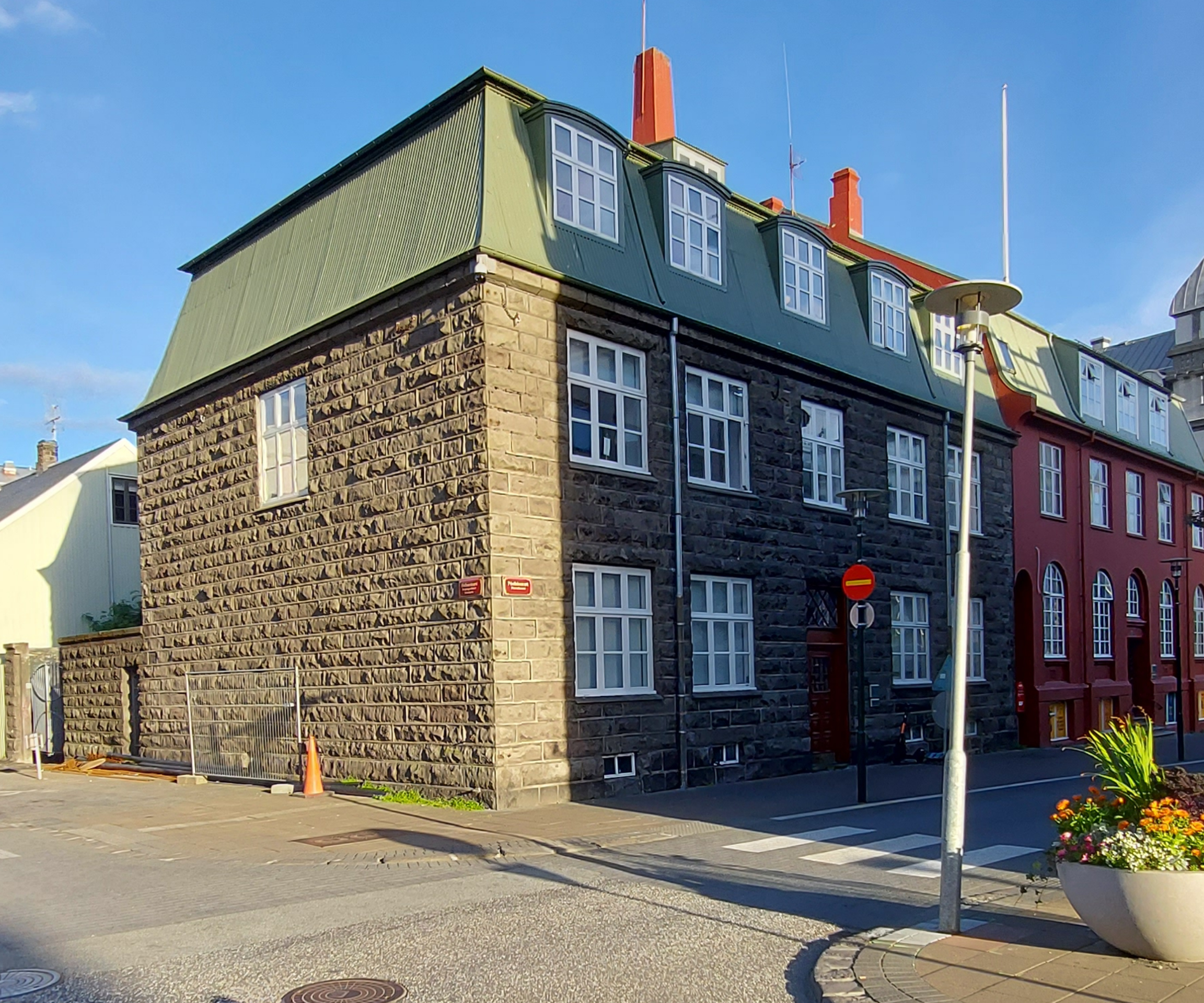
Former post office at Pósthússtræti 3.

In 1898, the post office was moved to a stone building, previously a school (built in 1882), at Pósthússtræti 3. It then became the first telephone exchange and headquarters of Iceland Telecom (Síminn) from 1906 to 1931 and from 1935 to 1965 it was a police station. The building was returned to Iceland Post in 1965.

==== Move to Pósthússtræti 5 ====
In 1914, a larger post office was constructed next to the existing office at Pósthússtræti 5, on the corner of Austurstræti and Pósthússtræti. Until the 1960s, it was the only post office in Reykjavík, when city district post offices began to be established. The Reykjavík post office was the main sorting office for the whole country. International airmail began in the 1950s, as well as domestic airmail becoming an important part of the distribution network in the latter part of the 20th century.

==== Telecom merger ====
In 1935, the postal service and the national telephone company were merged under the name Póstur og Sími (Post and Telephone). In rural towns, Póstur og Sími constructed combined facilities which housed telephone exchanges, telecom equipment, retail post offices and sorting offices.

==== Postcodes and new sorting office ====
In 1970, three-digit postcodes were introduced in Iceland. The first digit is ordered approximately clockwise around the country starting from Reykjavík (e.g. 101 for Reykjavík central).

Conditions were considered cramped in the central Reykjavík sorting office. As a result, in 1984 a new sorting office was built in Ármúli, then in the outskirts of Reykjavík. The relatively new sorting office in Ármúli was designed with manual sorting in mind and was already unsuitable by the 1990s.

==== Original post office ====
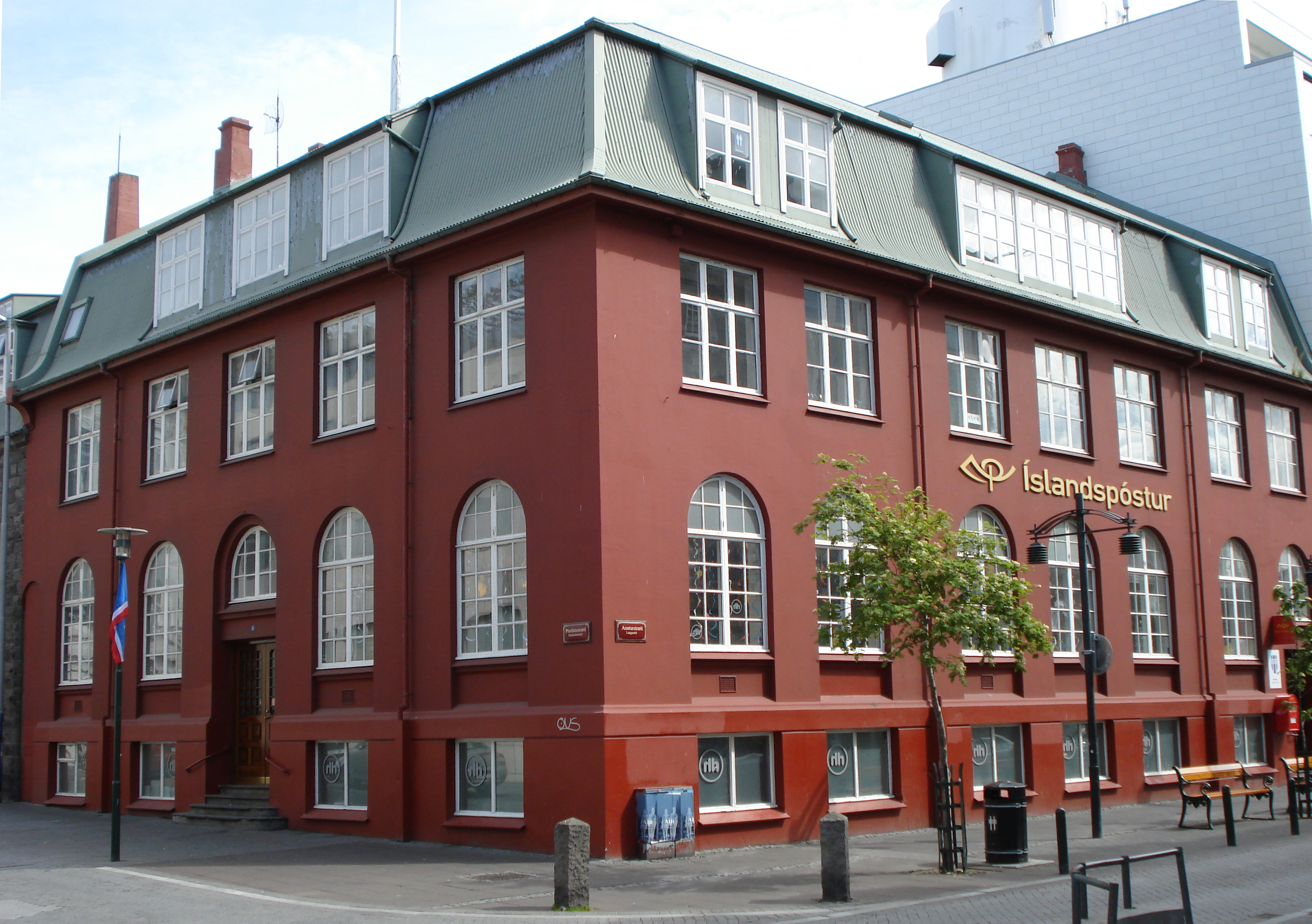
Former central Reykjavík post office at Pósthússtræti 5 built in 1914 and closed in 2018.

In 2002, part of the Pósthússtæti post office (built in 1914) was converted to office space and a youth centre, but a local post office remained in the building until it closed in 2018. It was converted to a food hall in 2022, called the 'Post Office Food Hall'.

=== Split from Síminn ===
In 1998, postal services were again split from telecoms becoming Landssími Íslands (later called Síminn, Iceland Telecom) and Íslandspóstur (Iceland Post).

==== New sorting warehouse ====
A large purpose-built postal sorting warehouse was constructed at Höfðabakki in 1998. The sorting office in Ármúli later became the headquarters of Síminn in 2000 after the split. Höfðabakki is still in use as the main sorting centre and headquarters for Iceland Post as of 2024.

Automatic letter sorting commenced in 2001.

==== Telegrams ====
In 2005, Iceland Post acquired the telegram service from Síminn, having previously been operated jointly before the split. Telegrams were mostly used at the time for formal and commemorative messages to family (e.g. confirmations, birthdays). The telegram services were discontinued in 2018.

==== 2020 and beyond ====
In the 2020s, in response to poor finances, Iceland Post began significantly reducing the number of post offices, both in rural areas and in the Reykjavík region. Self-service parcel lockers have been introduced in place of post offices. The number of postboxes have also been reduced.

In 2020, Iceland Post announced it would cease issuing new stamps, exiting the philately market. It will continue to sell existing editions of older stamps and may reprint older stamps if necessary to replenish its stock.

== Operations ==
Iceland Post operates postal services in Iceland under a universal service obligation. It delivers international and domestic letters and parcels countrywide. It also operates post offices, postboxes and parcel lockers.

In some post offices it offers packaging, boxes and stationery for sale, as well as Western Union money transfer services. Stamps are sold in post offices as well as through some distributors such as service stations, convenience stores and bookstores.

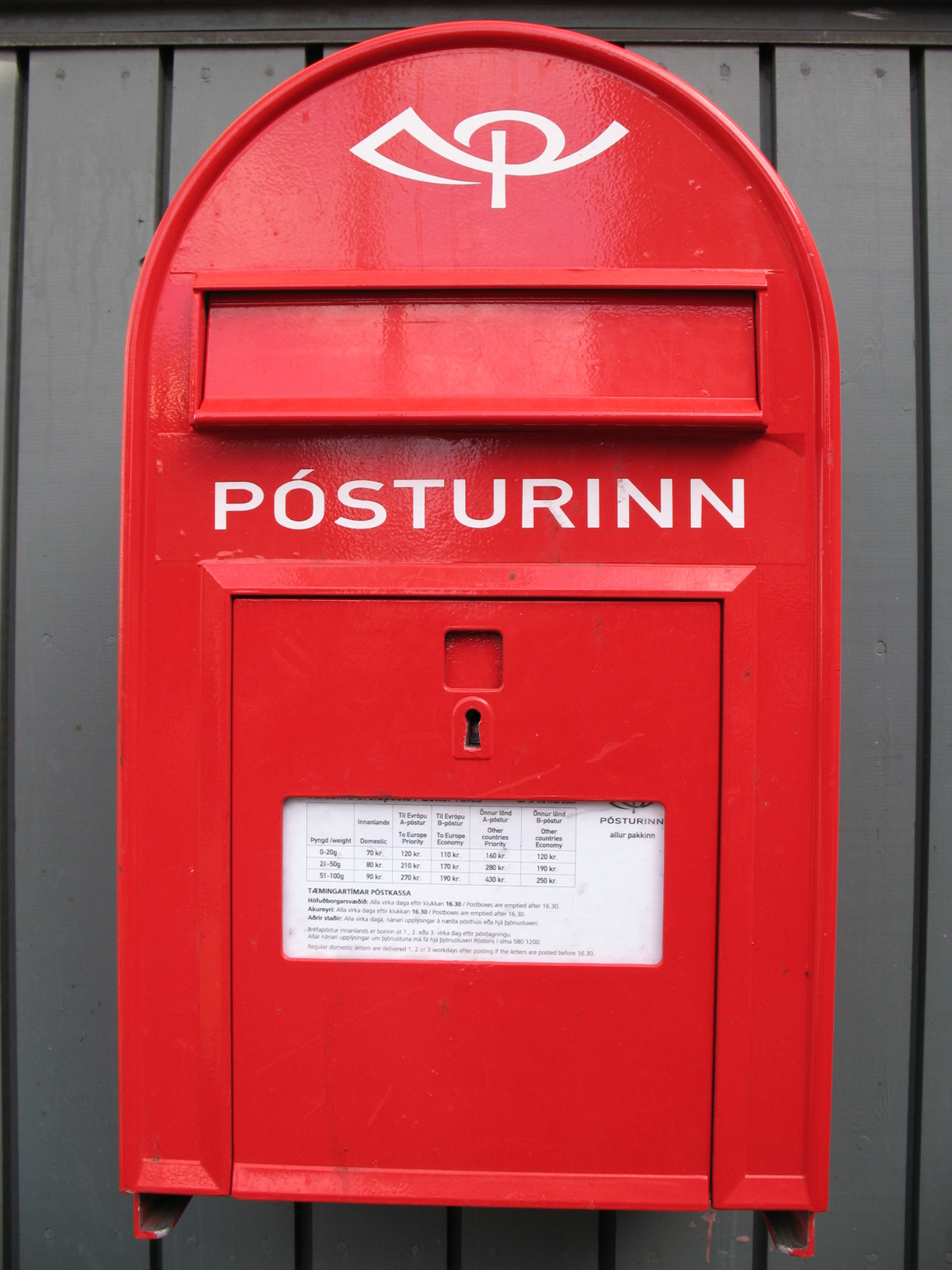
Postbox of Iceland Post

== See also ==
- Telecommunications in Iceland
- Postage stamps and postal history of Iceland
- Postal codes in Iceland
- Síminn
