= Ten Little Indians =

American children's counting-out rhyme

"Ten Little Indians" is an American children's counting out rhyme. It has a Roud Folk Song Index number of 12976. In 1868, songwriter Septimus Winner adapted it as a song, then called "Ten Little Injuns", for a minstrel show.

== Lyrics ==
The modern lyrics for the children's rhyme are:

One little, two little, three little Indians,
Four little, five little, six little Indians,
Seven little, eight little, nine little Indians,
Ten little Indian boys.

Ten little, nine little, eight little Indians,
Seven little, six little, five little Indians,
Four little, three little, two little Indians,
One little Indian boy.

== Minstrel song ==
Songwriter Septimus Winner created an elaborated version of the children's song, called "Ten Little Injuns", in 1868 for a minstrel show.

Ten little Indians standin' in a line,
One toddled home and then there were nine;

Nine little Indians swingin' on a gate,
One tumbled off and then there were eight.

Eight little Indians gayest under heav'n.
One went to sleep and then there were seven;

Seven little Indians cuttin' up their tricks,
One broke his neck and then there were six.

Six little Indians all alive,
One kicked the bucket and then there were five;

Five little Indians on a cellar door,
One tumbled in and then there were four.

Four little Indians up on a spree,
One got fuddled and then there were three;

Three little Indians out on a canoe,
One tumbled overboard and then there were two

Two little Indians foolin' with a gun,
One shot t'other and then there was one;

One little Indian livin' all alone,
He got married and then there were none.

== Derivative songs and books ==
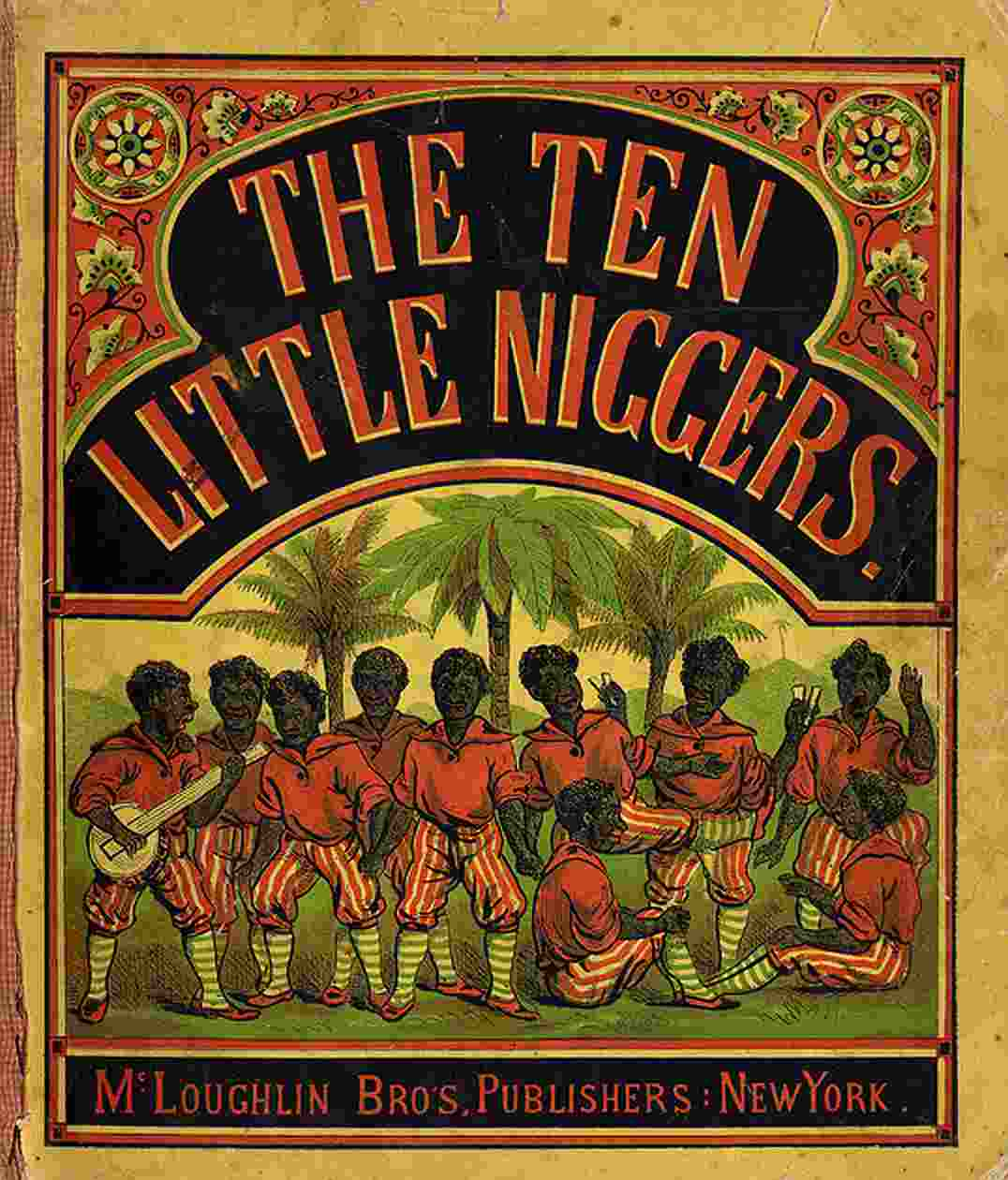
Book cover by Frank Green, 1869

It is generally thought that this song was adapted, possibly by Frank J. Green in 1869, as "Ten Little Niggers", though it is possible that the influence was the other way around, with "Ten Little Niggers" being a close reflection of the text that became "Ten Little Indians". Either way, "Ten Little Niggers" became a standard of the blackface minstrel shows. It was sung by Christy's Minstrels and became widely known in Europe, where it was used by Agatha Christie in her 1939 novel of the same name, about ten killings on a remote island. The novel was later retitled And Then There Were None for the American edition, although the original title remained in use for the UK publication until 1985, and it remains one of her most famous works. The Spanish and Russian titles of Christie's novel today are still Diez negritos and «Десять негритят», respectively, and the German children's song, with a different melody, is called "Zehn kleine Negerlein".

Variants of this song have been published widely as children's books; what the variants have in common is 'that they are about dark-skinned boys who are always children, never learning from experience'. For example, it had been published in the Netherlands by 1913; in Denmark by 1922 (in Börnenes billedbog); in Iceland in 1922 (as "Negrastrákarnir"); and in Finland in the 1940s (in Kotoa ja kaukaa: valikoima runosatuja lapsille and Hupaisa laskukirja). The Bengali poem "Haradhon er Dosti Chhele" ("Haradhon's Ten Sons") is also inspired by "Ten Little Indians".

=== Criticism of racist language ===
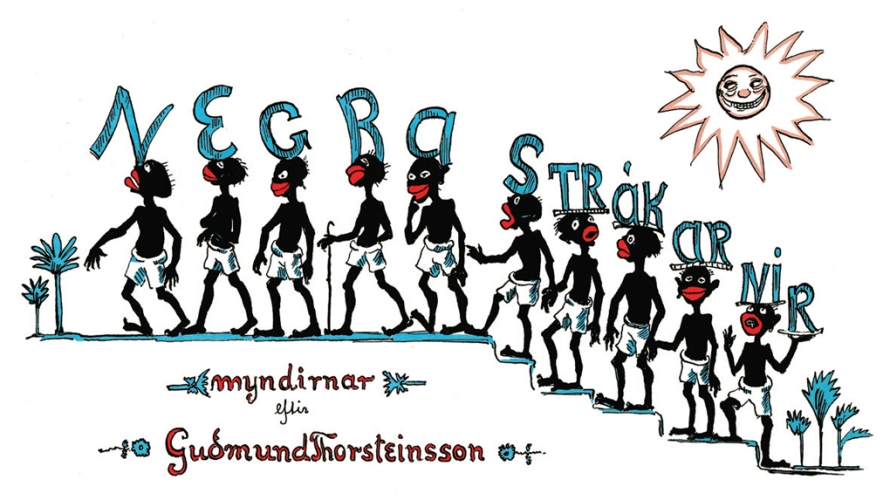
Cover of "Negrastrákarnir", an Icelandic version of the song published in 1922

Because of changing sensibilities over the words used, modern versions for children often use "aeroplanes", "soldier boys" or "teddy bears" as the objects of the rhyme, among others. Icelandic publisher Skrudda's unaltered republication in 2007 of the 1922 Icelandic version of Ten Little Negroes caused considerable debate in that country, with a strong division between those who saw the book as racist and those who saw it as "a part of funny and silly stories created in the past". In Kristín Loftsdóttir's assessment of the debate, she states:

Some of the discussions focusing on the republishing of the Ten Little Negroes can be seen as colonial nostalgia in the sense that they bring images of more simple times when such images were not objected to. As such, these public discourses seek to separate Icelandic identity from past issues of racism and prejudice. Contextualising the publication of the nursery rhyme in 1922 within European and North American contexts shows, however, that the book fitted very well with European discourses of race, and the images show similarity to caricatures of black people in the United States.

The republishing of the book in Iceland triggered a number of parodies or rewritings: Tíu litlír kenjakrakkar ("Ten little prankster-children") by Sigrún Eldjárn and Þórarinn Eldjárn; 10 litlir sveitastrákar ("Ten little country-boys") by Katrín J. Óskarsdóttir and Guðrún Jónína Magnúsdóttir; and Tíu litlir bankastrákar ("Ten little banker-boys") by Óttar M. Njorðfjörð.

=== 1945 version ===
The following version of the song was included in the first film version of And Then There Were None (1945), which largely took Green's lyrics and replaced the already sensitive word "nigger" with "Indian":

Ten little Indian boys went out to dine;
One choked his little self and then there were nine.
Nine little Indian boys sat up very late;
One overslept himself and then there were eight.
Eight little Indian boys traveling in Devon;
One said he'd stay there and then there were seven.
Seven little Indian boys chopping up sticks;
One chopped himself in halves and then there were six.
Six little Indian boys playing with a hive;
A bumblebee stung one of them and then there were five.
Five little Indian boys going in for law;
One got in Chancery and then there were four.
Four little Indian boys going out to sea;
A red herring swallowed one and then there were three.
Three little Indian boys walking in the zoo;
A big bear hugged one and then there were two.
Two little Indian boys sitting in the sun;
One got all frizzled up and then there was one.
One little Indian boy left all alone;
He went and hanged himself and then there were none.

== See also ==
- Ten Green Bottles
- Ten Little Indians (The Beach Boys song)
- Ten Little Indians (Harry Nilsson song)

== Cited and general references ==
- "Reviews and Literary Notices". The Atlantic Monthly. Vol. III, no. XX. Boston: Phillips, Sampson, and Company. June 1859. pp. 770–779.
- Loftsdóttir, Kristín (2011). "Racist Caricatures in Iceland in the 19th and the 20th Century". In Ísleifsson, Sumarliði R.; Daniel Chartier (eds.). Iceland and Images of the North. Quebec City: Presses de l'Universite du Quebec; The Reykjavik Akademy. pp. 187–204. ISBN 9782760530874. OCLC 867786117.
- Wilson, B. M. (1895). "John Brown's Ten Little Injuns". Wilson's Book of Drills and Marches for Young People and Small Children of Both Sexes. New York: Dick & Fitzgerald. pp. 32–36.
