= Icelandic Language Day =

National holiday

Icelandic Language Day (Icelandic: dagur íslenskrar tungu, English: "day of the Icelandic tongue") is a festival celebrated on 16 November each year in Iceland to celebrate the Icelandic language. This date was chosen to coincide with the birthday of the Icelandic poet Jónas Hallgrímsson.

In Autumn 1995, the Icelandic Minister of Education, Science and Culture, Björn Bjarnason, suggested that one day a year should be proposed to celebrate the Icelandic language, which has been well-preserved in its original form over the centuries, unlike most other languages; and the efforts to preserve this unique symbol of the country.

As such, on 16 November, the Minister of Education, Science and Culture awards the Jónas Hallgrímsson Award to someone who has "in a unique way contributed to the Icelandic language". The Minister may also visit a local area of Iceland's schools and cultural institutions, for example in 2004 Þorgerður Katrín Gunnarsdóttir visited Ísafjörður and in 2005 she visited Reykjanesbær.
