= 1918 Icelandic sovereignty referendum =

- 19 October 1918

Results
Choice	Votes	%
Yes	12,411	92.55%
No	999	7.45%
Valid votes	13,410	98.22%
Invalid or blank votes	243	1.78%
Total votes	13,653	100.00%
Registered voters/turnout	31,143	43.84%

A referendum on the Act of Union with the Kingdom of Denmark was held in Iceland on 19 October 1918. Voters were asked whether they approved of the Act, which would lead to Iceland becoming a separate kingdom under the Danish Crown, making the country a sovereign state in a personal union with Denmark. It was approved by 92.6% of voters.

== Results ==
Choice	Votes	%
For	12,411	92.6
Against	999	7.4
Invalid/blank votes	243	–
Total	13,653	100
Registered voters/turnout	31,143	43.8
Source: Nohlen & Stöver
