= Einar Jónsson =

Icelandic sculptor (1874–1954)

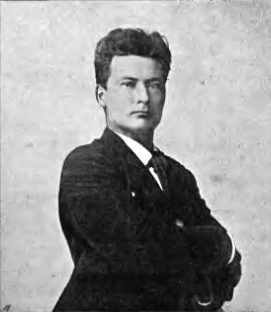
- Einar Jónsson in 1906
- Born: Einar Jónsson; 11 May 1874; Galtafell, Iceland
- Died: 18 October 1954 (aged 80); Reykjavík

Signature
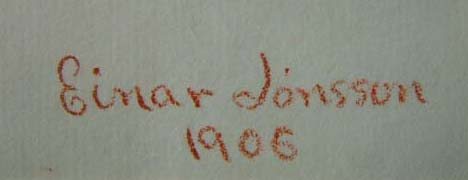

Einar Jónsson (11 May 1874 – 18 October 1954) was an Icelandic sculptor, born in Galtafell, a farm in southern Iceland.

== Biography ==
At a young age Einar proved himself to be an unusual child with an artistic bent. At that time there was little or no tradition of sculpture in Iceland, so Einar moved to Denmark where he attended the Copenhagen Academy of Art. In 1902 the Althing, the Icelandic parliament, awarded Einar a grant to study in Rome for 2 years. He returned from Rome to Copenhagen and settled down there. According to The Einar Jónsson Museum in Reykjavik, after residing in Rome:

"Jónsson completely rejected naturalistic depiction and publicly criticized the classical art tradition, which he felt had weighed artists down. He emphasized the need for artists to forge their own path and cultivate their originality and imagination instead of following the footsteps of others. His ideas were related to German symbolism, and he developed a figurative language composed of interpretable symbols, personification and allegory."

In 1909, after living abroad for almost 20 years he made an arrangement with the Althing to provide him with a home and studio in Reykjavík. In return, he agreed to donate all his works to the country. Einar designed this combination living and working space in collaboration with Architect Einar Erlendsson, though early plans for the house were designed for him by Iceland's State Architect, Guðjón Samúelsson, but these were never realised.

In 1914 Einar was awarded a commission by Joseph Bunford Samuel to create a statue of Icelandic explorer Þorfinnur Karlsefni (Thorfinn Karlsefni) for placement in Philadelphia. Bunford commissioned the sculpture through a bequest that his wife, Ellen Phillips Samuel, made to the Fairmount Park Art Association (now the Association for Public Art), specifying that the funds were to be used to create a series of sculptures "emblematic of the history of America." Thorfinn Karlsefni (1915–1918) was installed along Philadelphia's Kelly Drive near the Samuel Memorial and unveiled on 20 November 1920. There is another casting of the statue in Reykjavík, Iceland.

In 1917, the day after he married Anne Marie Jørgensen, he and his bride travelled to the United States to complete the work, and today Einar's intrepid Norseman stands on East River Drive in Philadelphia. Several years later, in 1921, his second major North American work was erected when the Icelandic community in Manitoba, Canada purchased a casting of his Jón Sigurðsson statue and had it placed in the Manitoba Legislative Building grounds in Winnipeg. As with the version in Reykjavík, this statue included the bas relief The Pioneers on the base.

After two years in America, Einar returned to Iceland where he produced an amazing body of work, none of it seen outside the country. Unlike most other sculptors, Einar worked almost entirely in plaster. This had to do partly with the lack of good modeling clay in Iceland, but it allowed Einar to work on his individual sculptures for years. Spending over a decade on a particular piece was not uncommon for him.

== Style of sculpture ==
Einar's works fall into three general categories. First, there were the public monuments that he was commissioned by the government to produce. The second group was private commissions that he obtained, consisting of portraits and cemetery monuments. The third collection consisted of the private works that he labored over as he became increasingly and deeply spiritually attuned and reclusive. In this large body of works Einar's spiritual nature is clearly seen, though it is often difficult to describe. The themes for these works are frequently drawn from Christ's consciousness, deep Cosmic spirituality like the eternal, infinite body and consciousness of the universe or God, Icelandic Mythology (Understanding of the so-called Norse mythology or North-East, North-West and even Central-European War-Godhs mythology is just a part of Icelandic Mythology and understanding or description of these is mostly derived from the Icelandic one) and Icelandic folk tales. Einar's world is populated by Elfs, "Hidden people" or "Huldufolk", Vættir, Jötnar, angels and trolls, by beautiful women and bold warriors, and most of all a layer of symbolic content that can invariably be felt, but not always understood.

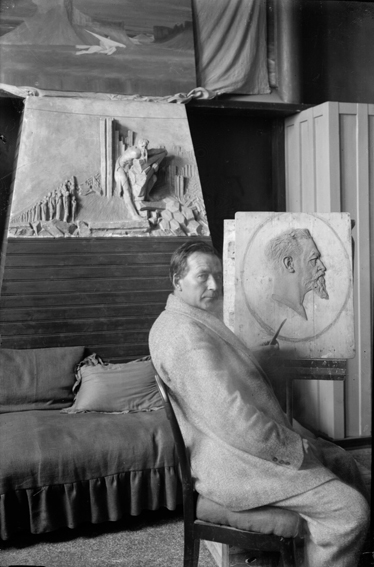
The artist in studio, c. 1923 – 1930. The bas relief behind him is from his Jón Sigurðsson monument in Reykjavik

A hint to some deeper meaning in Einar's powerful art is for example: "Karma" an eternal law of energy which returns all action towards its origin. Like in Christ's saying that one will reap what one has sown. That same law or eternal principle, changes the will and desires of the psyche or so to speak. This is because of the fed up condition or state of "mind" or psyche. One will eventually be tired and sick of destruction of nature or other people's lives and the desire for constructive live-giving actions will be dominant. One example of this is the sculpture "Skuld" where Einar uses Icelandic Mythological symbolism of "Urdur, Verdandi and Skuld" which were the witches of destiny or "Karma".

There are also very positive hints in other pieces of Einar's masterful art, to that, that every being or lifeform is eternal in its essence and evolves and chances on the outer sides or layers or material sides of its consciousness like the body, thoughts and desire. This outer part or detail of the consciousness is not even understood in physics, phenomenon of time, space and matter that is to say. The connection of the soul or rather its eternal and unchangeable part or layer of the whole consciousness to the world of time, space and matter is even further away from understanding except with symbols, and eventually later on, and only with self experience.

Henry Goddard Leach (see references) described Einar Jónsson like this:

All things considered, Jonsson is unique in the world of art.
If he had any prototype they were the symbolic artists of ancient
Egypt. But Jonsson's nearest spiritual relative is William Blake.

In recent years Einar's plasters have been cast in bronze and placed in the garden of his home and studio or in city parks in Reykjavík and throughout Iceland. He donated his work to the Einar Jónsson Museum in Reykjavík, which opened in 1923.

=== Public monuments ===
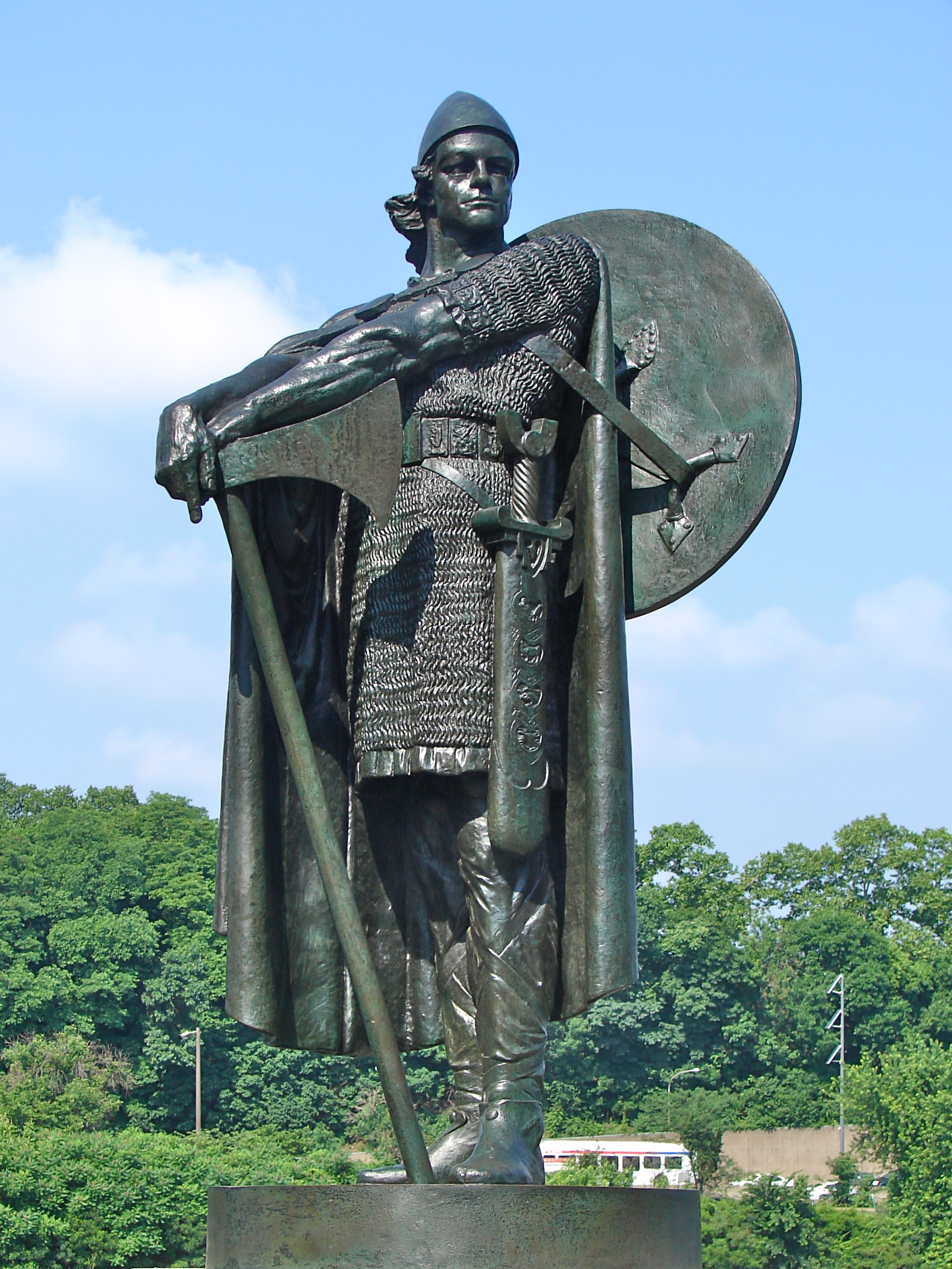
Þorfinnur Karlsefni (1920)

- The Outlaw – 1900
- Jónas Hallgrímsson – 1907
- Jón Sigurðsson – 1911
- Christian IX – 1915
- Þorfinnur Karlsefni – 1920
- Hallgrímur Pétursson – 1922
- Ingólfur Arnarson – 1924
- Hannes Hafstein – 1931

=== Private commissions ===
- Memorial to the Eisert Family of Lodz, Poland 1935
- Monument to Dr. Charcot and His Ship – 1936
- Memorial to a Lost Airliner - 1952
- various cemetery markers including ones for Hannes Hafstein and his wife Ragnheiður

=== Other works ===
- Birth of Psyche – 1915–18
- Breaking the Spell I – 1916–22
- Breaking the Spell II – 1916–27
- Dawn – 1897–1906
- End – 1906–38
- Evolution – 1913–14
- Fantasy on Yggdrasill, the Tree of Life – 1949
- Fate – 1900–27
- Grief – 1926–27
- Guilty Conscience – 1911–47
- King of Atlantis – 1919–22
- Pioneer – 1902–11
- Protection – 1912-1934
- Sparks I – 1913–31
- Spirit and Matter – 1918–22
- Thor Wrestling with Old Age – 1939–40
- Trees of Life and Death – 1909–40

== See also ==
- List of Icelandic artists
- Ingólfur Arnarson
- Hannes Hafstein
- Jónas Hallgrímsson

== Sources ==
- Einar Jónsson, Myndhöggvari, Skuggsjá, Bókabúð Olivers Steins SF Hafnarfjörður, 1982 OCLC 10780108
- Einar Jónsson, Myndir, Kaupmannahöfn, Prentsmiðja Martius Truelsens 1925
- Einar Jónsson: Poet in Stone, Einar Kvaran, photographs by David Finn, Sculpture Review, Winter 1998
- Einar Jónsson, Henry Goddard Leach, American-Scandinavian Review, Vol. 41& 42, 1953
- Einar Jónsson, Einar Jónsson, American-Scandinavian Review, Vol. 3. 1915
- Modernist sculpture parks and their ideological contexts – on the basis of the oeuvres by Gustav Vigeland, Bernhard Hoetger and Einar Jónsson, Małgorzata Stępnik, „The Polish Journal of Aesthetics", No 47 (4/2017), pp. 143–169.
