= Fjölnir (journal) =

19th-century Icelandic literary magazine

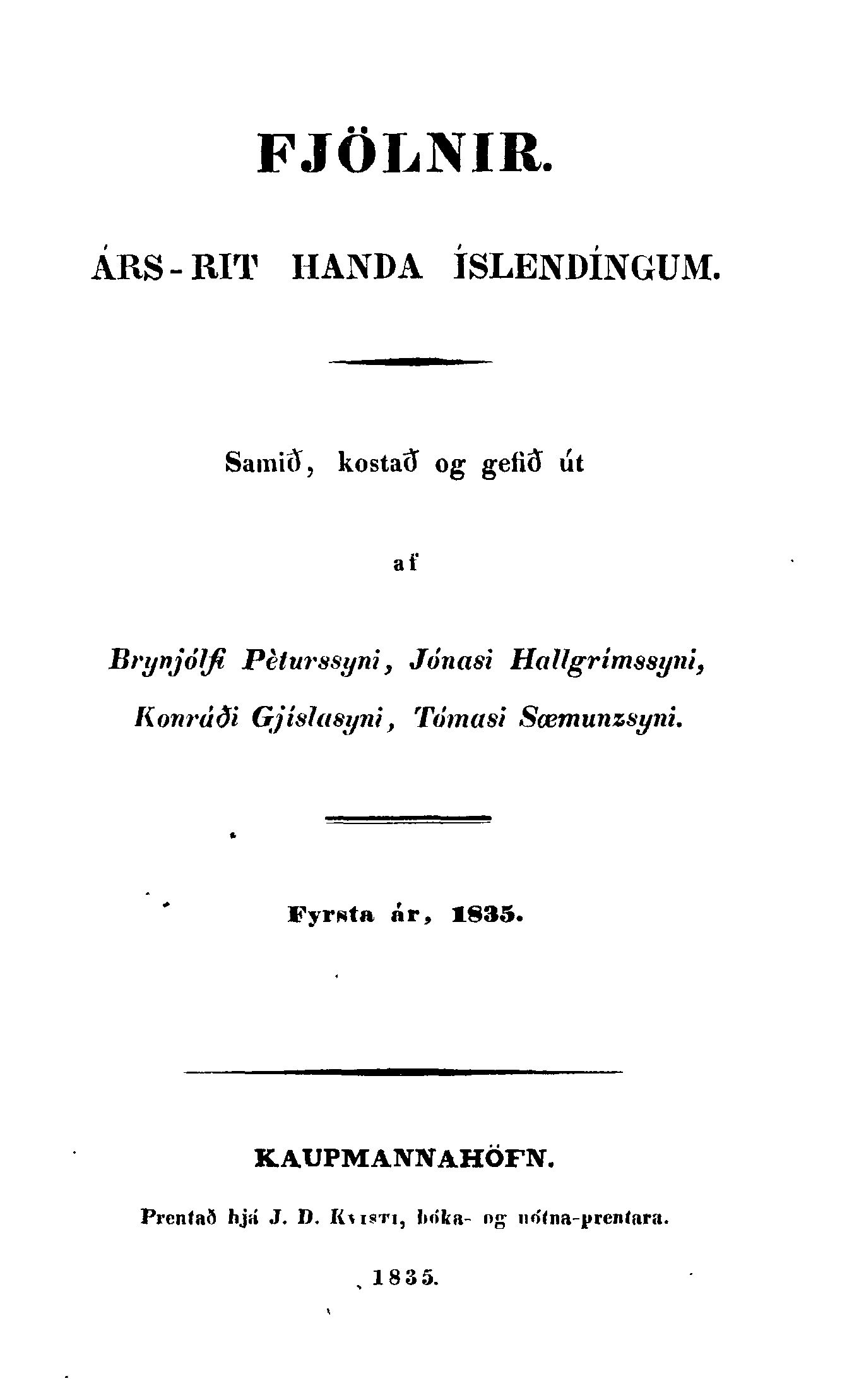
Front page of the first issue of Fjölnir, dated 1835. It bears the subtitle "A Yearly Journal for Icelanders"

Fjölnir (Icelandic pronunciation: [ˈfjœlnɪr̥]) was an Icelandic-language journal published annually in Copenhagen from 1835 to 1847.

The journal was founded by the Fjölnismenn (literally, "men of Fjölnir"), four young Icelandic intellectuals who sought to revive national consciousness in Iceland in the hopes of raising support for Icelandic independence. They were Jónas Hallgrímsson, Konráð Gíslason, Brynjólfur Pétursson and Tómas Sæmundsson.

All four were Icelanders who had studied at Bessastaðir and the University of Copenhagen. They all contributed to the publication of the journal until 1838. The fifth annual copy was published and paid for by Tómas Sæmundsson, who had moved back to Iceland, and had it printed in Viðey. Publication then ceased for a few years, as Jónas Hallgrímsson was occupied with his scientific research. A new issue was published in 1843, but at this point two societies, Fjölnisfélagið and Nokkrir Íslendingar, had taken over publication, led first by Gísli Magnússon and later by Halldór Kr. Friðriksson.

The last issue of the journal was published in 1847. It was dedicated to the memory of Jónas Hallgrímsson, who had died in the spring of 1845.

There is no evidence of the distribution numbers of the first few volumes but in the years 1843-1845, 300-400 copies of volumes 6-8 were sold in Iceland and Denmark. The volumes were most likely read aloud in large gatherings and loaned from farm to farm.

Fjölnir introduced romanticism in Icelandic literature and poetry, and many of Jónas Hallgrímsson's romantic poems were first published in the journal. It also spearheaded the revival of national and linguistic consciousness in Iceland. Fjölnir received a mixed reception among the Icelandic reading public, partly due to eccentric spelling conventions, and the perceived arrogance of the young Fjölnismenn. Nevertheless, it made important contributions to the revival of Icelandic as a written language, and greatly influenced the cultural and political milieu in Iceland. Historian Gunnar Karlsson finds that it is difficult to determine the political influence of the volumes but that there can be little doubt that the volumes made a clear contribution to Icelandic poetry.

== See also ==
- Ný félagsrit
