= Tómas Sæmundsson =

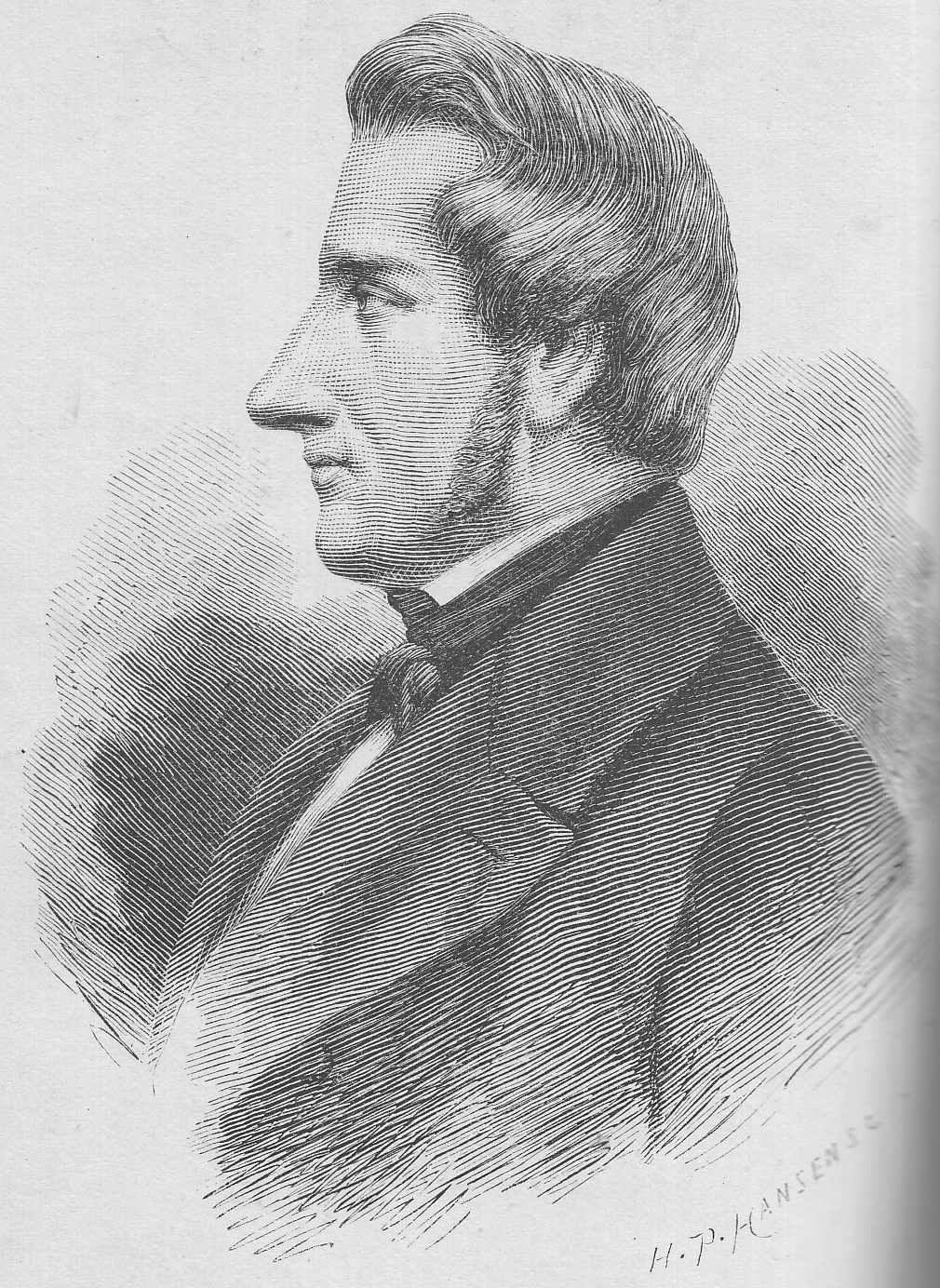
- 1888 portrait engraving of Sæmundsson
- Born: 7 June 1807
- Died: 17 May 1841 (aged 33)
- Occupations: Icelandic priest, author and nationalist

Tómas Sæmundsson (7 June 1807 – 17 May 1841) was an Icelandic priest, and one of the Fjölnismenn, a group of Icelandic intellectuals who spearheaded the revival of Icelandic national consciousness and gave rise to the Icelandic Independence Movement. According to author Daisy Neijmann, he was "one of the era's most fervent nationalists".

Tómas is quoted by J. R. R. Tolkien in his lecture English and Welsh, as saying "Málin eru höfuðeínkenni þjóðanna..." (Languages are the chief distinguishing marks of peoples ...):

Languages are the chief distinguishing marks of peoples. No people in fact comes into being until it speaks a language of its own; let the languages perish and the peoples perish too, or become different peoples. But that never happens except as the result of oppression and distress.

— Tómas Sæmundsson.

Tómas travelled around Europe from 1832 to 1834, and he became the pastor in Breiðabólsstaður in Fljótshlíð in 1835. Among other things, Tómas wrote the fifth annual issue of the journal Fjölnir.
