= Kristín Loftsdóttir =

Icelandic academic

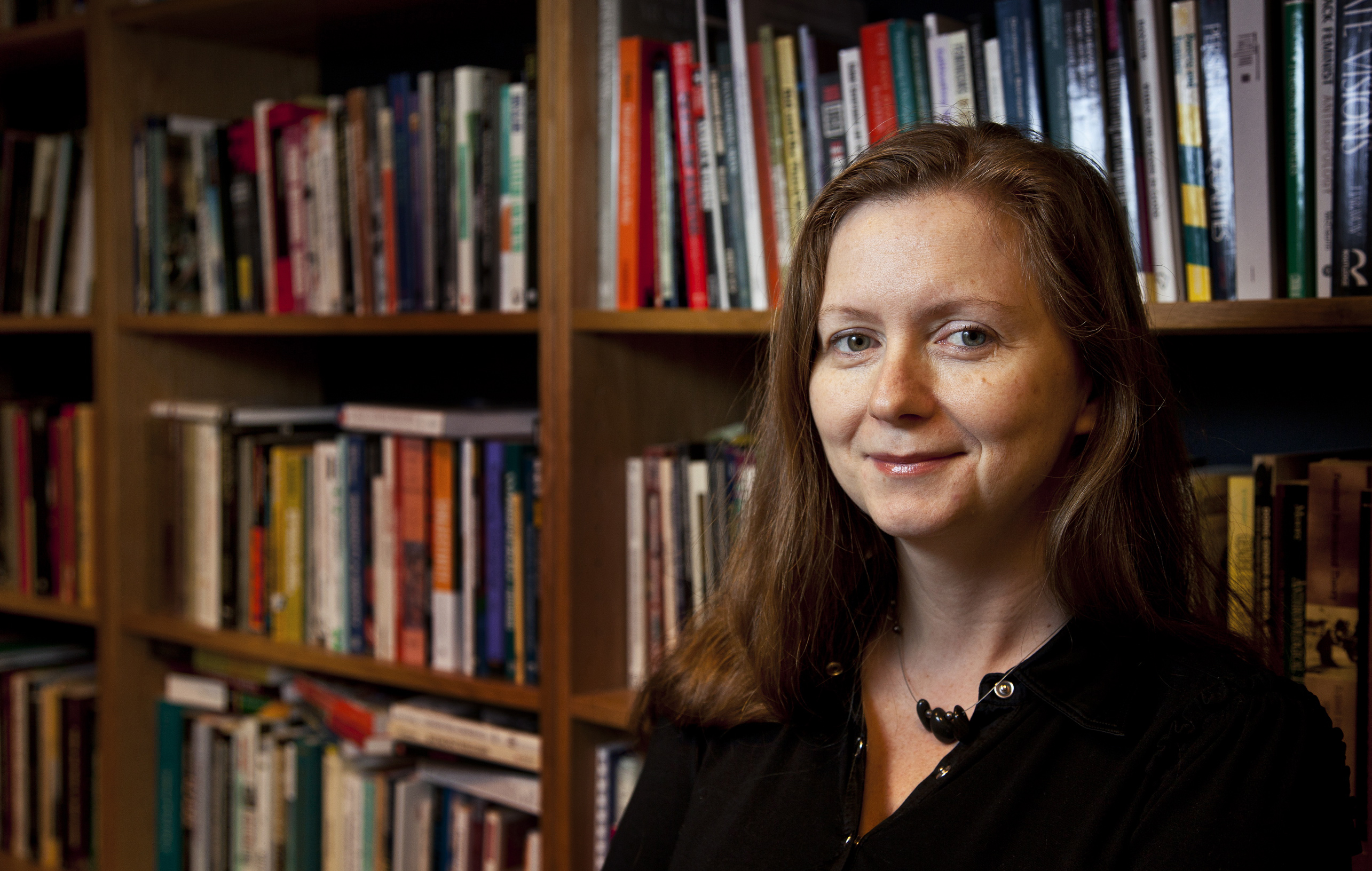
- Born: 1968 (age 57–58); Hafnarfjörður, Iceland
- Education: University of Iceland (B.A., 1992); University of Arizona (Masters, 1994; PhD, 2000)
- Occupation: Professor in anthropology at the University of Iceland

Kristín Loftsdóttir (born 1968) is a professor in anthropology at the University of Iceland.

Kristín has organized and been part of diverse research projects. Examples include research on racism, colonialism, whiteness, precarious migrants, crisis, and nationalism. Kristín has also conducted research relating to the tourism industry, development cooperation and masculinity. Kristín has done research in Europe (Iceland, Belgium, and Italy), as well as West Africa (Niger). Kristín's writings have also appeared in many scholarly journals and chapters in books. Kristín has written three monographs and two novels and edited six books with others.

== Education ==
Kristín Loftsdóttir was born in 1968 in Hafnarfjörður. She completed her matriculation examination from Flensborgarskóli in Hafnarfjörður in 1989 and a BA in Anthropology from the University of Iceland in 1992. She went to graduate school abroad and graduated with a master's from the University of Arizona in Tucson, Arizona, in 1994, and then completed a doctorate at the same university in 2000. Her doctoral research revolved around global changes in the lives of pastoralists and migrant workers. She did her project in Niger, where she lived for two years while gathering data during the research. The title of her dissertation is “The Bush is Sweet: Identity and Desire among WoDaaBe in Niger.”

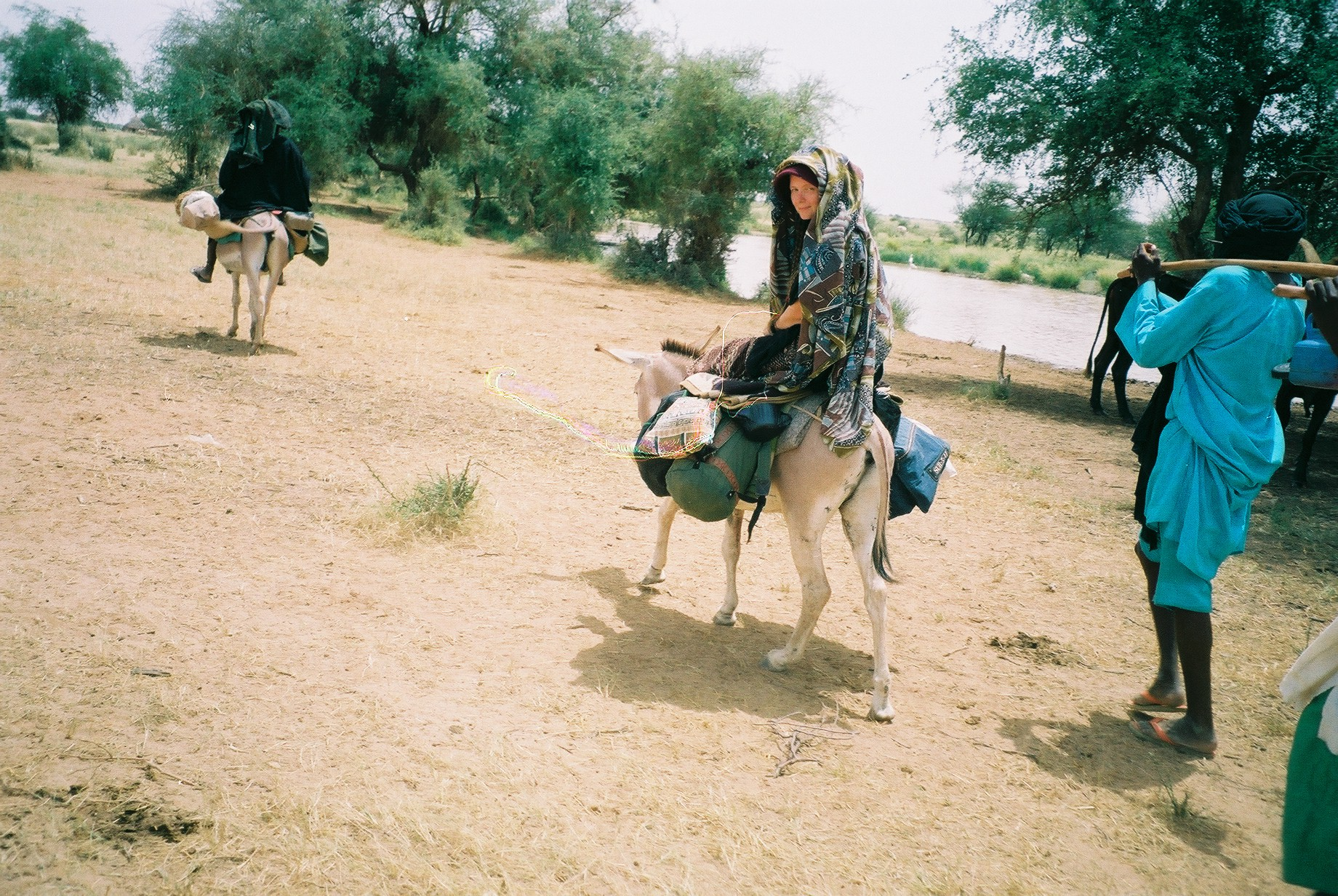
Kristín Loftsdóttir in Niger in 1997

== Professional experience ==
Kristín has been engaged in various international collaborations and participated in and directed international projects. Kristín, for example, was project manager of Icelandic Identity in Crisis (supported by The Icelandic Centre for Research). She was also one of three project managers of the top project Mobility and Transnational Iceland (supported by The Icelandic Centre for Research). She was one of two managers of the associative projects “Crisis and Nordic Identity” and “Decoding the Nordic Colonial Mind” that NOS-HS supported. She was a member of the HERA project Arctic Encounters, 2013–2015.

Kristín has been a guest teacher at the University of Graz, Lafayette College, Roskilde University, and the Austrian Academy of Sciences. She has also taught the summer school "Noise" at Utrecht University. In 2014, the University of Iceland recognised Kristín for her academic work. Her book The Woman Who Got a Spear in Her Head (Konan sem fékk spjót í höfuðið) discusses research procedure in anthropology in an accessible manner. It won the Women's Literary Prize 2011 and was nominated for a Hagþenkir Award in 2010 as well as the DV Prize 2010.

== Works of fiction ==
Kristín won the Icelandic Children's Book Prize in 1988 for Bird in a Cage (Fugl í búri). Her book Time's Footstep (Fótatak tímans) was published by Vaka Helgafell in 1990. The same year it was nominated for the Icelandic Literary Prize.

== Exhibitions ==
Kristín is one of the authors (along with Unnur Dís Skaptadóttir) of the exhibition Iceland in the World and the World in Iceland, 2016–2017. The exhibition was part of Kristín's research project Icelandic Identity in the Crisis, supported by the Research Fund of the University of Iceland and The Icelandic Centre for Research. The exhibition's main goal was to shed light on transnationalism as a part of both Iceland's history and present and to highlight how Icelanders have for centuries been part of history's racial prejudices in Europe. The exhibition was done in collaboration with other scholars at the University of Iceland and in collaboration with Iceland's National Museum. The exhibition's emphasis on racism built on Kristín's research on the republication of the book Negroboys.

Kristín also set up the exhibition "The cow's horns do not weigh it down: Kristín Loftsdóttir’s Ethnographic Research amongst WoDaaBe Pastoralists in Niger." The exhibition was in Hafnarborg, Hafnarfjörður's Centre of Culture and Fine Art. The exhibition ran from 4 March to 12 April 2001. It was then set up in the National and University Library of Iceland. The exhibition's name is from a proverb of the WoDaaBe people. It points out that just as the cow does not notice its horns, we do not notice what we are used to.

== Research ==
Kristín's research in Iceland has underscored the importance of considering the present in the context of the history of racial prejudices, and how they are recreated in the present. Her research has through the lens of anthropology and post-colonialism brought up critical questions about racism in Europe – particularly in Iceland and other Nordic countries. It has pointed out as well the importance of analysing "whiteness" in this context. Kristín's research has also critically examined the concept and idea of "Europe" – both the hierarchy of European nations and issues related to the exclusion of certain groups from the Continent.

Kristín's research on the Icelandic economic collapse emphasises the moulding of national self-images in an inter connected world, as well as how the collapse reawakened old questions about being a nation among nations. In addition, Kristín has posed critical questions on the meaning of being a European that come up in relation to Iceland's economic expansion and the collapse. Kristín's articles on this topic have discussed symbolic significance of the opening and closing the McDonald's fast-food chain in Iceland; the Icesave dispute as a crisis of national self-image in Iceland, and national ideas about the business Vikings.

Kristín's research in this field has been conducted within larger and smaller projects. Kristín did the research project "Images of Africa in Iceland". It examined historical manifestations of Africa and racial ideas in Iceland. Kristín also researched the republication of the book Negroboys in 2007. Kristín has researched Lithuanians' experience in Iceland in the years during the economic crisis. She showed that Lithuanians encountered extensive prejudice in Iceland. Recently, Kristín has critically examined images of the tourism industry in relation to ideas of Nordic exceptionalism, and of purity and whiteness.

Kristín's research on prejudices has overlapped her projects focusing on refugees and her writings related to them. She has discussed the refugees' "crisis" and worked on research revolving around precarious migrants (including refugees and asylum seekers) from Niger. The research examines the reasons that refugees from Niger go to Europe. It points out as well the difference in assistance provided to different groups, depending on their historical ties with Europe.

== Private life ==
Kristín's parents are Loftur Magnússon (1945) and Erla Guðlaug Sigurðardóttir (1947). She is married to Már Wolfgang Mixa, lector at Reykjavík University. They have three children.

== Main works ==
- Crisis and Coloniality at Europe‘s Margins: Creating Exotic Iceland. 2019. Routledge.
- Messy Europe: Crisis, Race and Nation-State in a Postcolonial World (editor with Andrea Smith og Brigitte Hipfl). 2018. New York: Berghahn Press.
- Ísland í heiminum og heimurinn í Íslandi (editor with Unni Dís Skaptadóttir and Önnu Lísu Rúnarsdóttir). Reykjavík: Þjóðminjasafn Íslands.
- Crisis in the Nordic Nations and Beyond (editor with Lars Jensen). 2014. Routledge.
- Whiteness and Postcolonialism in the Nordic Region (editor with Lars Jensen). 2012. Routledge.
- Teaching Race with an Edge. (editor with Brigitte Hipfl). 2012. Budapest: ATGENDER (European Association for Gender Research) and Central European Press.
- Konan sem fékk spjót í höfuðið: Flækjur og furðuheimar vettvangsrannsókna. 2010. Reykjavík: Háskólaútgáfan.
- The Bush is Sweet: Identity, Power and Development among WoDaaBe Fulani in Niger. 2008. Uppsala: Nordic Africa Institute (published in France in 2012 under the name Les Peuls WoDaaBé du Niger: Douce brousse, í þýðingu Marie-Francoise De Munck. París: L‘Harmattan)
