= Jón Sigurðsson =

Leader of the 19th-century Icelandic independence movement (1811–1879)

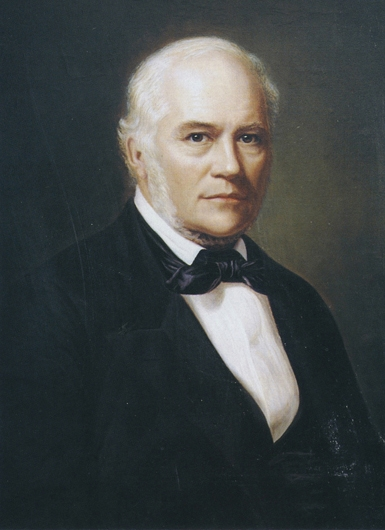
- Portrait of Jón by Þórarinn B. Þorláksson
- Born: 17 June 1811; Hrafnseyri, Arnarfjörður, Iceland
- Died: 7 December 1879 (aged 68); Copenhagen, Denmark
- Known for: Icelandic independence movement

Jón Sigurðsson (17 June 1811 – 7 December 1879) was the leader of the 19th century Icelandic independence movement.

== Biography ==
Born at Hrafnseyri, in Arnarfjörður in the Westfjords area of Iceland, he was the son of Þórdís Jónsdóttir and pastor Sigurður Jónsson. In 1833, he moved to Denmark to study grammar and history at the University of Copenhagen. While in Denmark, Jón developed syphilis and was bedridden for an extended period. According to historian Guðjón Friðriksson, Jón showed little interest in politics prior to his bout of syphilis.

After completing his education, Jón began to work at the Arnamagnæan Institute, which was then the home of the manuscripts of the Icelandic sagas. He became an expert on the sagas and on Icelandic history. He never graduated from university, as Icelandic politics grew to consume all his time.

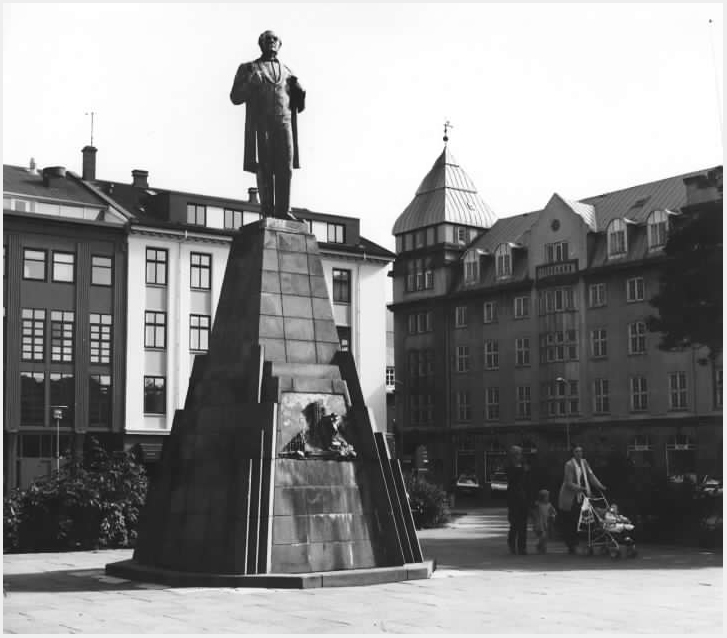
Einar Jónsson's statue of Jón Sigurðsson in Reykjavík. Another casting exists in Winnipeg, Manitoba

Before Jón moved to Denmark he proposed to his cousin, Ingibjörg Einarsdóttir, and she and her father, Jón's uncle, accepted the proposal. However Jón and Ingibjörg did not marry until 1845, when Jón came to Iceland for the first time since 1833 to sit at the restored Alþing. Jón had been elected to the Alþing in 1844 as an MP for Ísafjörður county. He managed to hold on to this seat throughout his life although he did not attend all sessions of the Alþing. In all, he came to 13 of the 17 sessions that were held in his lifetime. He also attended the National Assembly of 1851. There he led the Icelanders in their resistance to the adoption of Denmark's 1849 constitutional reform. The constitution was never formally adopted in Iceland, and after years of struggle the Danish Government granted Iceland a limited constitution in 1874 giving autonomy in internal affairs. Until then the Alþing had only been an advisory body to the Danish government and king. He served as speaker of the Alþing from 1875 to 1877.

Jón's way of communicating with the Icelandic nation from Denmark where he lived and worked was to publish an annual magazine called Ný félagsrit (New Association Writings). It was published almost every year from 1841 to 1873, with Jón always being the main contributor and financial backer.

The home of Jón and Ingibjörg in Copenhagen became a centre for all Icelanders in the city. They had no children except for one foster-son who was Jón's nephew. However, a contemporary remarked that "all Icelanders are their children".

Jón was a classical liberal, unlike most of his contemporary and subsequent nationalists. Historian Gunnar Karlsson describes him in the following fashion:

Jon Sigurdsson was by no means a typical 19th-century national hero. He was not an extreme nationalist and for his time, was rather devoid of romanticism. Above all, he was a protagonist of modernization, democracy, human rights and economic progress... Jon's career was not typical for a leader of a liberation movement either. He was never arrested for his political activity or spent a single night in prison. On the contrary, for most of his life he was sustained by rather generous research grants from various scholarly institutions, more or less funded by the Danish treasury.

Jón never requested full autonomy for Iceland during his lifetime. Jón called for greater self-rule, arguing that "the country should be allowed to govern itself as much as possible, in order for the great energy, which is inherent in the country but lies dormant, to be revived and to mature."

He died in Copenhagen in 1879.

== Legacy ==
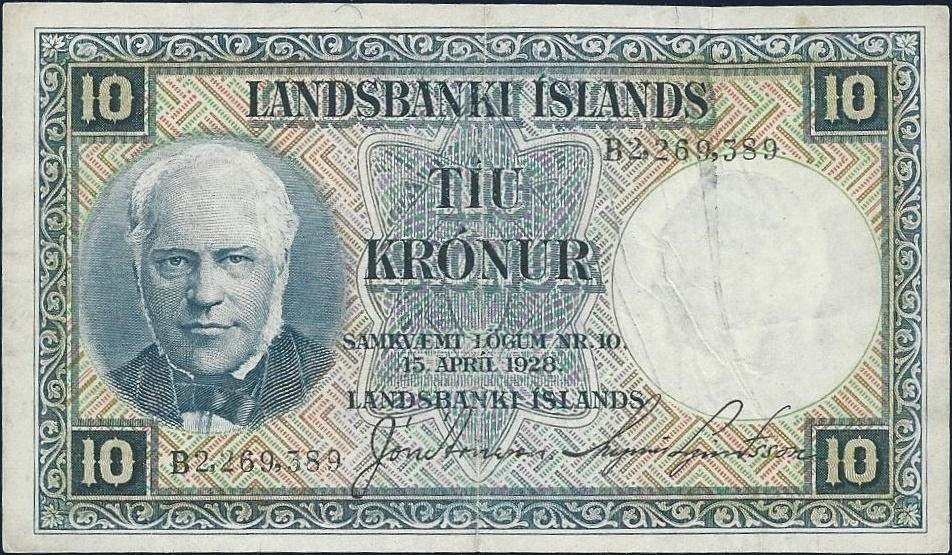
The portrait of Jón Sigurðsson on the obverse of an Iceland 10 Kronur banknote dated 1928.

His birthday, 17 June, was chosen as Iceland's National Holiday to recognize his efforts toward Icelandic independence.

He is often referred to as President ("Jón forseti") by Icelanders. The main reason for this is that he served as the president of Althing several times, for the first time in 1849. He also served as the President of the Copenhagen Department of Hið íslenska bókmenntafélag (the Icelandic Literature Society). He is currently pictured on Iceland's 500 krónur bill, and has been honoured on Icelandic postage stamps on the centenaries of his birth and death, the 150th anniversary of his birth, and on the creation of the Republic of Iceland (on his 133rd birthday).

The apartment which Jón and Ingibjörg rented at Øster Voldgade 12 in Copenhagen from 1852 is called Jónshús and has been the property of the Icelandic government since 1967. It serves as a cultural center for Icelanders in Denmark, and as housing for academics on sabbatical. A plaque on the corner with Stokhusgade commemorates that he used to live in the building.
