= Johann =

German masculine given name

- Pronunciation: Afrikaans: [juəˈɦan] German: [ˈjoːhan]
- Gender: Male

Origin
- Origin: Hebrew
- Meaning: "Yahweh is gracious", "Graced by Yahweh" (Johanan)
- Region of origin: Germanic

Other names
- Related names: Jan, John, Johan, Jóhann, Johannes, Juan

Johann (German pronunciation: [ˈjoːhan]) is a German male given name. It is derived from Iōhannēs / Jōhannēs, which is the Latin form of the Greek name Iōánnēs (Ἰωάννης), itself derived from Hebrew name Yochanan (יוֹחָנָן) in turn from its extended form Yehochanan (יְהוֹחָנָן), meaning "Yahweh is gracious" or "Yahweh is merciful". Its English language equivalent is John. It is uncommon as a surname.

== People ==
People with the name Johann include:

=== Mononym ===
- Johann, Count of Cleves (died 1368), nobleman of the Holy Roman Empire
- Johann, Count of Leiningen-Dagsburg-Falkenburg (1662–1698), German nobleman
- Johann, Prince of Hohenzollern-Sigmaringen (1578–1638), German nobleman

=== A–K ===
- Johann Adam Hiller (1728–1804), German composer
- Johann Adam Reincken (1643–1722), Dutch/German organist
- Johann Adam Remele (died 1740), German court painter
- Johann Adolf I, Duke of Saxe-Weissenfels (1649–1697)
- Johann Adolph Hasse (1699-1783), German Composer
- Johann Altfuldisch (1911—1947), German Nazi SS concentration camp officer executed for war crimes
- Johann Andreas Eisenmenger (1654–1704), German Orientalist
- Johann Baptist Wanhal (1739–1813), Czech composer
- Johann Balthasar Bullinger (1713-1793), Swiss painter, 6x great-grandson of Heinrich Bullinger
- Johann Bernhard Fischer von Erlach (1656–1723), Austrian architect
- Johann Bernoulli (1667–1748), Swiss mathematician
- Johann Böhm (chemist) (1895−1952), German Bohemian chemist
- Johann Böhm (historian) (1929–2024), Romanian-born German scholar
- Johann Böhm (German politician) (born 1937), German politician, former president of the Bavarian Landtag
- Johann Carl Fuhlrott (1803–1877), early German paleoanthropologist
- Johann Casimir of Simmern (1543–1592), German prince
- Johann Casimir, Duke of Saxe-Coburg (1564–1633)
- Johann Caspar Ferdinand Fischer (c. 1656–1746), German Baroque composer
- Johann Caspar Kerll (1627–1693), German Baroque composer and organist
- Johann Christian Bach (1735–1782), classical composer, son of Johann Sebastian, also known as "the London Bach"
- Johann David Heinichen (1683–1729), German Baroque composer and music theorist
- Johann David Köhler (1684–1755), German historian
- Johann Eck (1486–1543) German theologian
- Johann Esch (died 1523), one of the first two Lutheran martyrs
- Johann Evangelist Haydn (1743–1805), tenor singer, brother of Joseph and Michael Haydn
- Johann Frauenlob, 17th German century writer
- Johann Jakob Froberger (1616–1667), German Baroque musician
- Johann Friedrich Agricola (1720–1774), German musical theorist
- Johann Friedrich Reichardt (1752–1814), German composer
- Johann Fust (c. 1400–1466), German printer
- Johann Georg (several people)
- Johann Gerhard (1582–1637), Lutheran theologian
- Johann Gottfried Walther (1684–1748), German Baroque musician, Johann Sebastian's cousin
- Johann Gustav Stickel (1805–1896), German scholar
- Johann Hari (born 1979), English writer and journalist
- Johann Heermann (1585–1647), German poet
- Johann Heinrich Buttstett (1666–1727), German Baroque musician
- Johann (Falco) Hölzel (1957–1998), Austrian rock singer
- Jóhann Jóhannsson (1969–2018), Icelandic composer
- Johann Peter Kellner (1705–1772), German organist and composer
- Johann Kuhnau (1660–1722), German Baroque musician, predecessor of Johann Sebastian Bach as Thomaskantor
- Johann Andreas Kuhnau (1703–1761), nephew of the preceding, a pupil of Bach

=== L–Z ===
- Johann Lafer (born 1957), Austrian television chef
- Johann Lamont (born 1957), Scottish politician, leader of the Scottish Labour Party
- Johann Le Bihan (born 1979), retired French swimmer
- Johann Lindner (born 1959), retired Austrian hammer thrower
- Johann Lohel (1549–1622), archbishop of Prague
- Johann Ludwig Krebs (1713–1780), German Baroque musician and organist, student of Johann Sebastian Bach
- Johann Lukas Schönlein (1793–1864), German naturalist and professor of medicine
- Johann Martin Schleyer (1831–1912), German Catholic priest
- Johann Mattheson (1681–1764), German composer, a close friend of Georg Friedrich Händel
- Johann Nepomuk Hiedler (1807–1888), great-grandfather of Hitler
- Johann Nepomuk Hummel (1778–1837), Austrian composer
- Johann Pachelbel (1653–1706), German Baroque composer
- Johann Pauls (1908–1946), German SS concentration camp officer executed for war crimes
- Johann Heinrich Pestalozzi (1746-1827) German pedagogue and educational reformist
- Johann Baptist Albin Rauter (1895–1949), executed Austrian Nazi SS war criminal
- Johann-Georg Richert (1890–1946), German Nazi officer executed for war crimes
- Johann Rupert (born 1950), South African businessman
- Johann Gottlob Schmeisser (1751–1806), Canadian Lutheran minister
- Johann Rudolf Stadler (1605–1637), Swiss clock-maker
- Johann Schicht (1855–1907), German Bohemian entrepreneur
- Johann Schreck (1576–1630), German missionary and polymath
- Johann Sebastian Bach (1685–1750), German composer and musician of the Baroque period
- Johann Sebastian Paetsch (born 1964), American cellist
- Johann Stamitz (1717–1757), Czech composer
- Johann Strauss I (1804–1849), Austrian Romantic composer
- Johann Strauss II (1825–1899), Austrian composer of light music, son of the above
- Johann Strauss III (1864–1939), also known as Johann Eduard Strauss, Austrian composer, nephew of the above
- Johann Samuel Schwerdtfeger (1734-1803), Lutheran minister, the first in Upper Canada.
- Johann Sziklai (born 1947), German poet and teacher
- Johann Tserclaes, Count of Tilly (1559-1632), Dutch Catholic field marshal
- Johann van Beethoven (c. 1739–1792), German musician, father of Ludwig van Beethoven
- Johann Carl Vogel (1932–2012), South African physicist
- Johann Wadephul (born 1963), German politician and diplomat
- Johann Weyer (1515–1588), Dutch physician
- Johann Wolfgang Dobereiner, German chemist
- Johann Wolfgang von Goethe (1749–1832), German writer and statesman
- Johann Zacherl (1814–1888), Austrian inventor
- Johann Zarco (born 1990), French motorbike racer

== Fictional characters ==
- Johann Kraus, in the Hellboy universe, featured in B.P.R.D. comic books, published by Dark Horse Comics
- the title character of Johann Mouse, an American 1953 cartoon short
- Johann Trinity, in the anime series Mobile Suit Gundam 00
- Johan Liebert (ヨハン・リーベルト, Yohan Rīberuto) is the titular "monster" and main antagonist of the Monster anime series.

== See also ==
- Eoin
- Giovanni (name)
- Hans (given name)
- Ioannis
- Ivan (name)
- Jaan (given name)
- Ján
- Janez (given name)
- Jantz
- Jean (disambiguation)
- João
- Johan (disambiguation)
- Jóhann
- Johannes
- Johanns
- John
- Jon
- Jón
- Jonathan (name)
- Juan
- Juhani
- Shawn (given name)
- Siôn
- Yannis
- Yohan (name)
- Yo-han
- All Wikipedia pages beginning with Johann
