= Jonke =

Jonke is a German surname. Etymologically, it is a diminutive of the name Johann 'John'. Variations of the surname Jonke include Jonker, Yonke, and Yonker. It appears in Germany, Austria, and other German-language territories, as well in Slovenia, where the surname appeared among Gottschee Germans. The surname may refer to:

- Frank Jonke (born 1985), Canadian soccer player
- Georg Jonke (1777–1864), Carniolan priest and beekeeper
- Gert Jonke (1946–2009), Austrian poet, playwright and novelist
- John Jonke (born 1987), Canadian soccer player
- Ljudevit Jonke (1907–1979), Croatian linguist
