= 1869 in Iceland =

- Decades: 1840s; 1850s; 1860s; 1870s; 1880s
- See also: Other events of 1869; Timeline of Icelandic history

Events in the year 1869 in Iceland.

== Incumbents ==
- Monarch: Christian IX
- Council President of Denmark: Christian Emil Krag-Juel-Vind-Frijs
- Governor of Iceland: Hilmar Finsen

== Events ==
- Capital punishment in Iceland: The death penalty was abolished for minor offences.
- Miðdalskirkja was constructed in Mosfellsprestakalli.

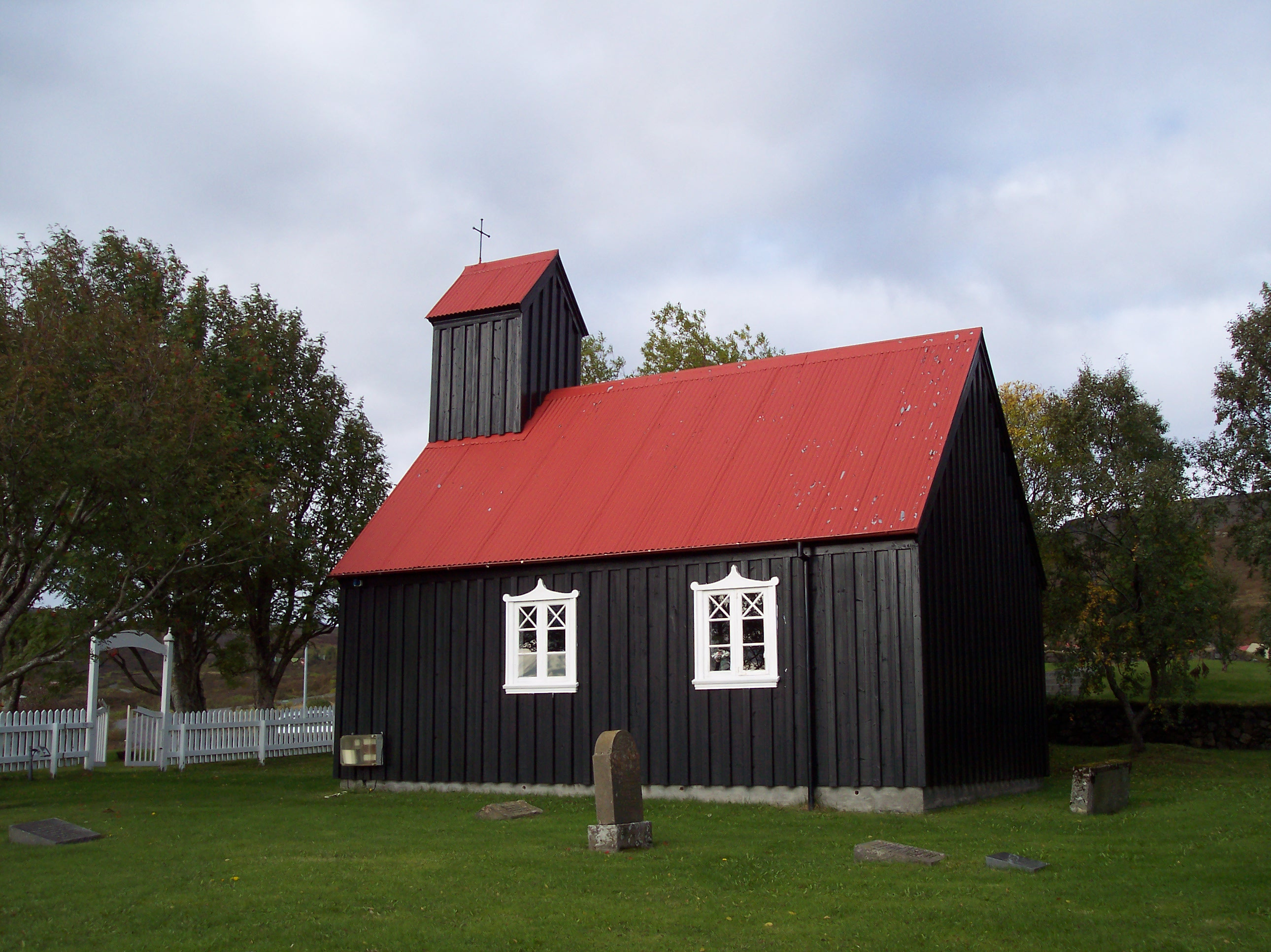
Miðdalskirkja constructed in 1869

== Births ==
- 25 April − Jón Jónsson Aðils, historian
