= Thorarensen =

Thorarensen is an Icelandic surname. Unusual for Icelandic names, this is a family name. Notable people with the surname include:

- Bjarni Thorarensen (1786–1841), Icelandic poet and official
- Björg Thorarensen (born 1966), Icelandic professor of law at the University of Iceland
- Jakob Thorarensen (1886–1972), Icelandic writer and poet
