= 1871 in Iceland =

- Decades: 1850s; 1860s; 1870s; 1880s; 1890s
- See also: Other events of 1871; Timeline of Icelandic history

Events in the year 1871 in Iceland.

== Incumbents ==
- Monarch: Christian IX
- Council President of Denmark: Ludvig Holstein-Holsteinborg
- Governor of Iceland: Hilmar Finsen

== Events ==
- 2 January − Stöðulög (The Laws of Standing) on the constitutional standing of Iceland within the realm) were laws passed by Denmark.

== Births ==
- Sigríður Tómasdóttir, environmentalist
