= Jóhann =

Jóhann is a masculine given name. It is the Icelandic and Faroese form of the name Johann, a form of the Germanic and Latin given name "Johannes". The English-language form is John.

The Icelandic surname Jóhannsson is a patronymic surname meaning son of Jóhann. Jóhannsdóttir is a patronymic surname meaning daughter of Jóhann.

== People ==
People with the name include:

- Jóhann Ársælsson (born 1943), Icelandic politician
- Jóhann Berg Guðmundsson (born 1990), Icelandic professional footballer
- Jóhann Birnir Guðmundsson (born 1977), retired Icelandic footballer
- Jóhann Hafstein (1915–1980), Icelandic politician; prime minister of Iceland 1970–1971
- Jóhann Haraldsson (born 1979), Icelandic alpine skier
- Jóhann Hjartarson (born 1963), Icelandic chess grandmaster
- Jóhann Jóhannsson (1969–2018), Icelandic composer
- Jóhann Páll Jóhannsson (born 1992), Icelandic politician
- Jóhann Laxdal (born 1990), Icelandic football player
- Jóhann K. Pétursson (1913–1984), Icelandic man with gigantism
- Jóhann Sigurðarson (born 1956), Icelandic actor, voice actor, and singer
- Jóhann Gunnar Sigurðsson (1882–1906), Icelandic poet
- Jóhann Sigurjónsson (1880–1919), Icelandic playwright and poet
- Jóhann Vilbergsson (born 1935), Icelandic alpine skier
- Marel Jóhann Baldvinsson (born 1980), Icelandic football forward
- Ólafur Jóhann Ólafsson (born 1962), Icelandic businessman, writer, and scientist
- Steingrímur Jóhann Sigfússon (born 1955), Icelandic politician
- Stefán Jóhann Stefánsson (1894–1980), Icelandic politician; prime minister of Iceland 1947–1949
- Jakob Jóhann Sveinsson (born 1982), Icelandic Olympic swimmer

== See also ==
- Jóhan Troest Davidsen (born 1988), Faroese footballer
- Johann
- Johan (disambiguation)
- Johannes
- John (given name)
- Alternate forms for the name John
