= 1867 in Iceland =

- Decades: 1840s; 1850s; 1860s; 1870s; 1880s
- See also: Other events of 1867; Timeline of Icelandic history

Events in the year 1867 in Iceland.

== Incumbents ==
- Monarch: Christian IX
- Council President of Denmark: Christian Emil Krag-Juel-Vind-Frijs
- Governor of Iceland: Hilmar Finsen

== Establishments ==
- July 24 − Reykjavik Shooting Association, Iceland's oldest sport association is founded

== Births ==
- February 14 − Þórarinn B. Þorláksson, painter
- April 11 − Helgi Jónsson

== Deaths ==
- December 4 − Helgi G. Thordersen, the third Bishop of Iceland, served in office until 1866
