= 1866 in Iceland =

- Decades: 1840s; 1850s; 1860s; 1870s; 1880s
- See also: Other events of 1866; Timeline of Icelandic history

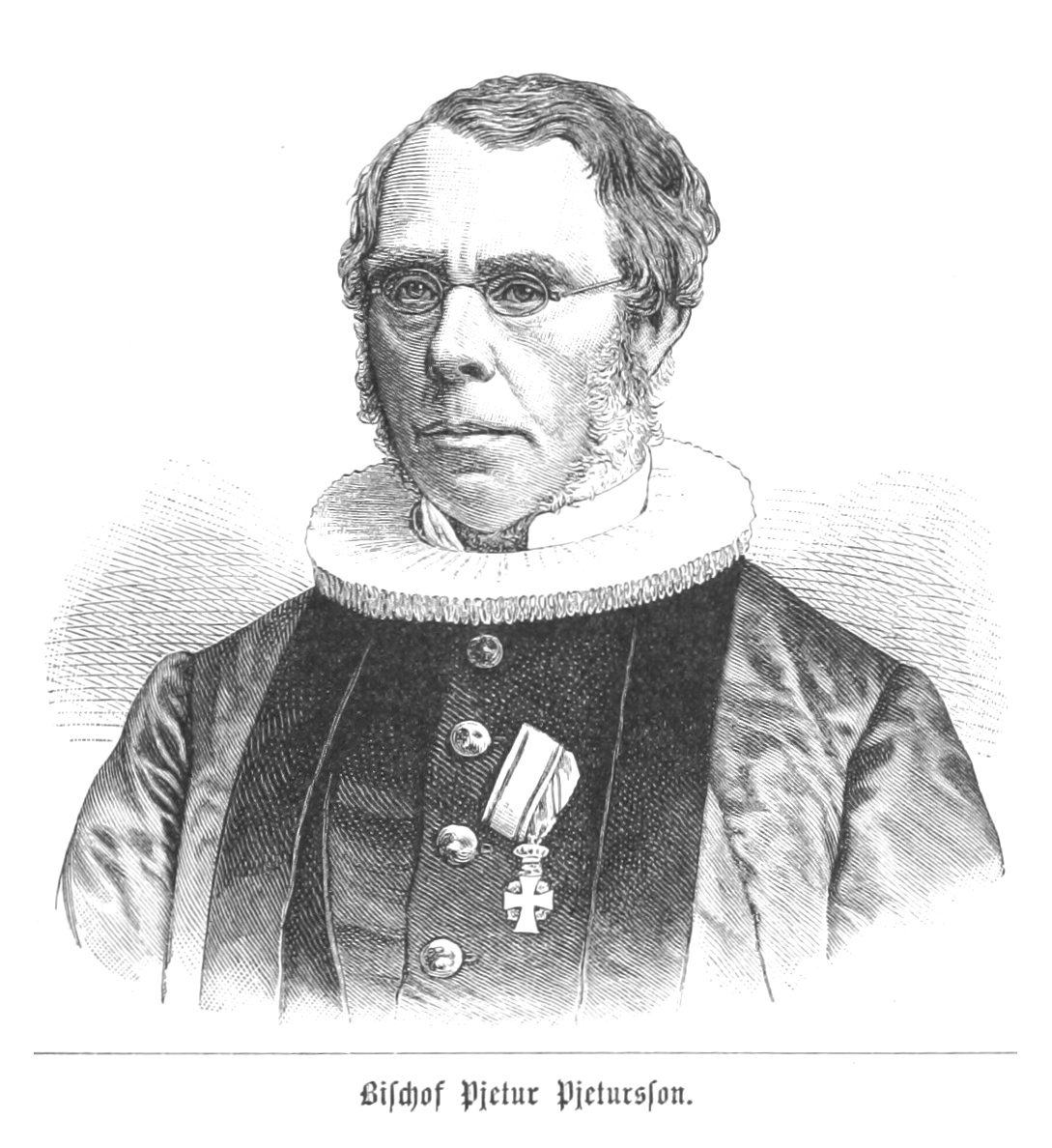
Pétur Pétursson, Bishop of Iceland (1866-1889)

Events in the year 1866 in Iceland.

== Incumbents ==
- Monarch: Christian IX
- Council President of Denmark: Christian Emil Krag-Juel-Vind-Frijs
- Governor of Iceland: Hilmar Finsen

== Events ==
- Pétur Pétursson became the fourth Bishop of Iceland, succeeding Helgi G. Thordersen in the position.

== Births ==
- June 21 − Jón Helgason, poet
