= 1870 in Iceland =

- Decades: 1850s; 1860s; 1870s; 1880s; 1890s
- See also: Other events of 1870; Timeline of Icelandic history

Events in the year 1870 in Iceland.

== Incumbents ==
- Monarch: Christian IX
- Council President of Denmark: Christian Emil Krag-Juel-Vind-Frijs (until: 28 May); Ludvig Holstein-Holsteinborg onwards
- Governor of Iceland: Hilmar Finsen

== Events ==
- William Morris visits Iceland for the first time.

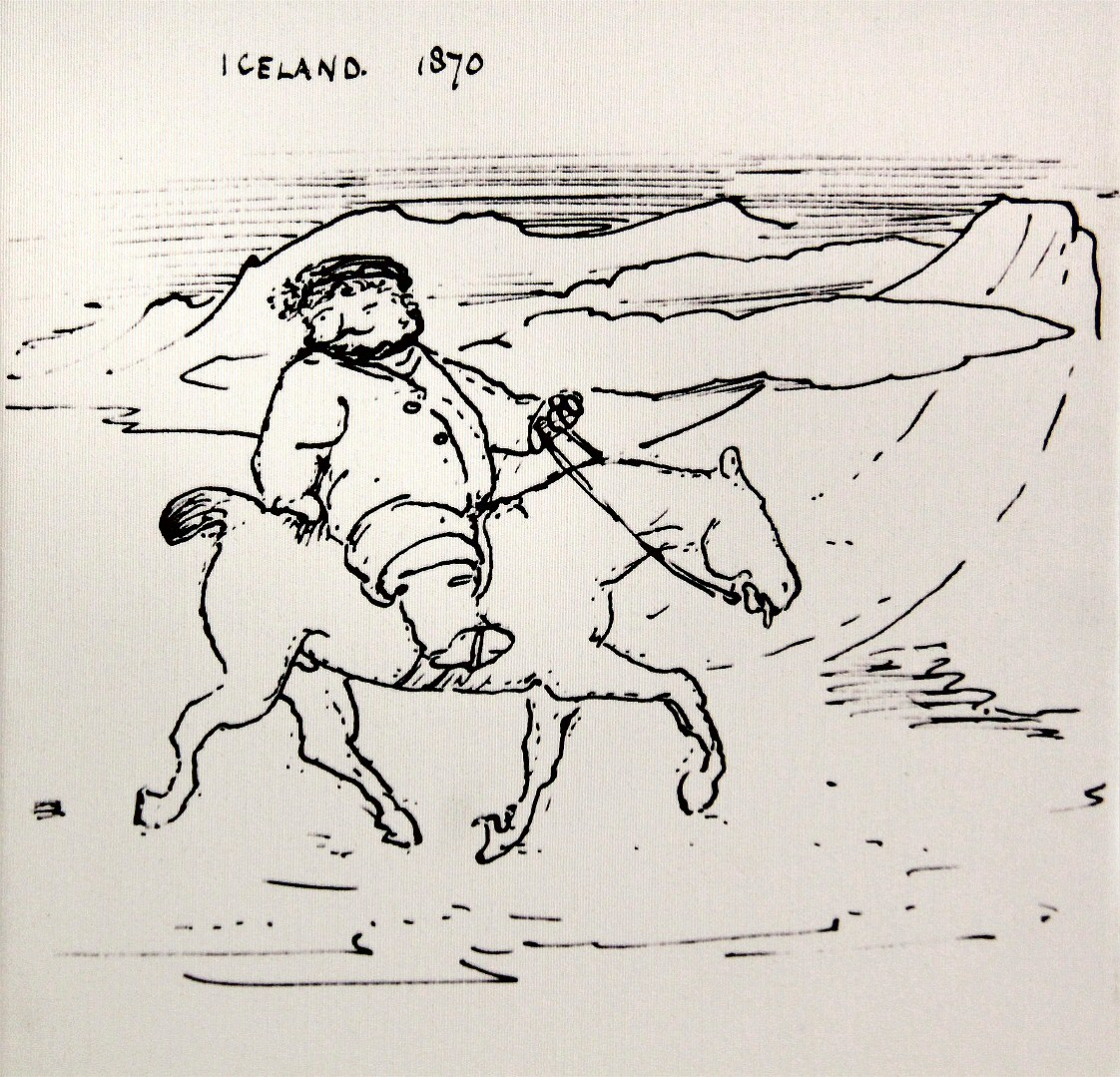
William Morris on pony in Iceland, 1870 cartoon by Edward Burne-Jones.

== Births ==
- 26 September − Christian X of Denmark (Kristján 10), the only King of Iceland.
