= 1865 in Iceland =

- Decades: 1840s; 1850s; 1860s; 1870s; 1880s
- See also: Other events of 1865; Timeline of Icelandic history

The following events occurred in Iceland in the year 1865.

== Incumbents ==
- Monarch: Christian IX
- Council President of Denmark: Christian Albrecht Bluhme (until 6 November); Christian Emil Krag-Juel-Vind-Frijs onwards
- Governor of Iceland: Þórður Jónassen

== Establishments ==
- The church at Hruni was built.

== Births ==
- June 6 − Axel V. Tulinius, politician
