= Konca Vas =

Konca Vas Konec (until 1952)
- Location in Slovenia
- Coordinates: 45°40′19.22″N 14°50′40.84″E
- Country: Slovenia
- Traditional region: Lower Carniola
- Statistical region: Southeast Slovenia
- Municipality: Kočevje

Area
  - Total: 0.4 km^{2} (0.15 sq mi)
- Elevation: 484.8 m (1,591 ft)

Population (2002)
  - Total: 112
- Postal code: 1332

Konca Vas (pronounced [ˈkoːntsa ˈʋaːs]; Slovene: Konca vas, formerly Konca or Konec; German: Ort) is a small settlement immediately north of Stara Cerkev in the Municipality of Kočevje in southern Slovenia. The area is part of the traditional region of Lower Carniola and is now included in the Southeast Slovenia Statistical Region.

== Geography ==
Konca Vas is a compact village on a low rise. The soil is loamy and fertile. The settlement is surrounded by fields used to grow wheat and barley.

== Name ==
The Slovene name of the settlement is derived from the Slovene common noun konec 'upper end of a valley', referring to the village's location as the hills narrow near it. The name of the settlement was officially changed from Konec to Konca vas in 1952. However, the name Konca vas was already in use much earlier. The German name Ort has the same semantic motivation; the word now simply means 'place, location' but originally referred to an 'outer end' or 'point'.

== History ==
The land registry of 1574 recorded four full farms divided into eight half-farms in Konca Vas. The original Gottschee German population of the village was evicted in the fall of 1941, after which the village stood empty. House no. 13 in the village has a plaque stating that Jože Šeško, an agitator for the Liberation Front, was captured there on April 28, 1942 (he was shot in Ljubljana on May 11, 1942). Konca Vas was resettled after the Second World War by Slovenes from various areas.

== Notable people ==
Notable people that were born or lived in Konca Vas include:

- Georg Jonke (1777–1864), beekeeper
