= 1886 in Iceland =

- Decades: 1860s; 1870s; 1880s; 1890s; 1900s
- See also: Other events of 1886; Timeline of Icelandic history

Events in the year 1886 in Iceland.

== Incumbents ==
- Monarch: Christian IX
- Minister for Iceland: Johannes Nellemann

== Events ==
- 1 July – The national bank (Landsbanki) begins operations.
- A supplementary session of the Althing was first held in 1886.
- Staðarkirkja was constructed.
- Kirkjubólskirkja was constructed.

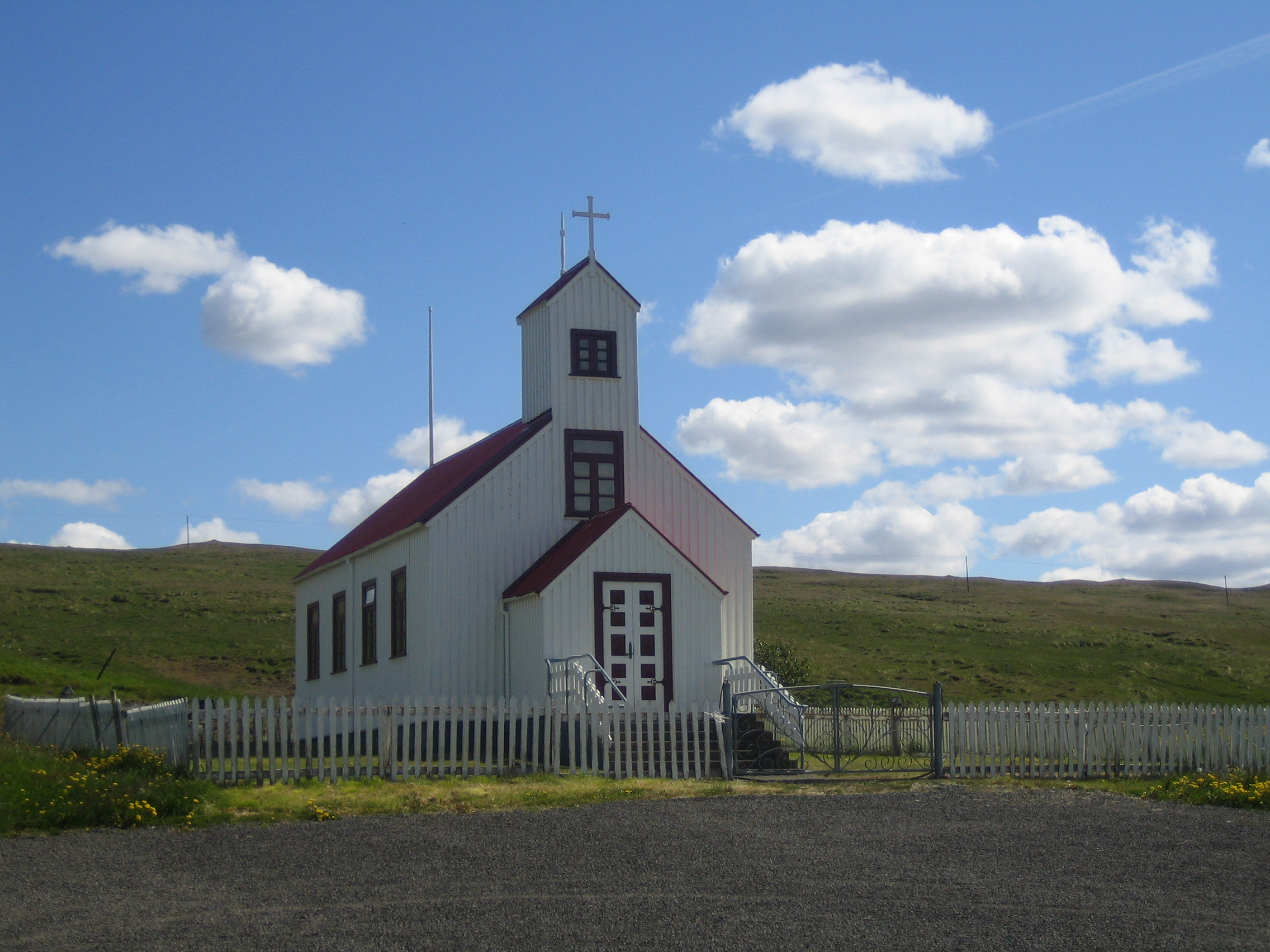
Staðarkirkja, constructed in 1886

== Births ==
- 18 May – Jakob Thorarensen, writer and poet.
- 14 September – Sigurður Nordal, writer and ambassador.
