= 1863 in Iceland =

- Decades: 1840s; 1850s; 1860s; 1870s; 1880s
- See also: Other events of 1863; Timeline of Icelandic history

Events in the year 1863 in Iceland.

== Incumbents ==
- Monarch: Frederick VII of Denmark (until 15 November); Christian IX onwards
- Council President of Denmark: Carl Christian Hall
- Governor of Iceland: Þórður Jónassen

=== Events ===
- 24 February − The National Museum of Iceland is established.

== Births ==
- 1 July − Theodóra Thoroddsen, poet.
- 3 December − Thor Philip Axel Jensen, Danish-born Icelandic entrepreneur.
