= 1868 in Iceland =

- Decades: 1840s; 1850s; 1860s; 1870s; 1880s
- See also: Other events of 1868; Timeline of Icelandic history

Events in the year 1868 in Iceland.

== Incumbents ==
- Monarch: Christian IX
- Council President of Denmark: Christian Emil Krag-Juel-Vind-Frijs
- Governor of Iceland: Hilmar Finsen

== Deaths ==
- 8 March − Jón Thoroddsen elder, poet
