= 1882 in Iceland =

- Decades: 1860s; 1870s; 1880s; 1890s; 1900s
- See also: Other events in 1882 · Timeline of Icelandic history

Events in the year 1882 in Iceland.

== Incumbents ==
- Monarch: Christian IX of Denmark
- Minister for Iceland: Johannes Nellemann

== Events ==
- 3 April – The National Archives of Iceland is established.
- An agricultural school is founded in Hólar, which would eventually become the Hólar University College.
- Single women and widows were granted the right to vote.

== Births ==
- 2 February – Jóhann Gunnar Sigurðsson, poet.
