= 1872 in Iceland =

- Decades: 1850s; 1860s; 1870s; 1880s; 1890s
- See also: Other events in 1872 · Timeline of Icelandic history

Events in the year 1872 in Iceland.

== Incumbents ==
- Monarch: Christian IX
- Council President of Denmark: Ludvig Holstein-Holsteinborg
- Governor of Iceland: Hilmar Finsen

== Events ==
- 20 November − Eymundsson, Iceland's oldest bookstore is established.

== Births ==
- 3 March − Sveinn Thorvaldson, Icelandic-Canadian politician
- 31 March − Helgi Pjeturss, geologist and philosopher
