= 1861 in Iceland =

- Decades: 1840s; 1850s; 1860s; 1870s; 1880s
- See also: Other events of 1861; Timeline of Icelandic history

Events in the year 1861 in Iceland.

== Incumbents ==
- Monarch: Frederick VII of Denmark
- Council President of Denmark: Carl Christian Hall
- Governor of Iceland: Þórður Jónassen

== Births ==
- 4 December − Hannes Hafstein, politician and poet.
