= 1862 in Iceland =

- Decades: 1840s; 1850s; 1860s; 1870s; 1880s
- See also: Other events in 1862 · Timeline of Icelandic history

Events in the year 1862 in Iceland.

== Incumbents ==
- Monarch: Frederick VII of Denmark
- Council President of Denmark: Carl Christian Hall
- Governor of Iceland: Þórður Jónassen

=== Events ===
- Skútustaðakirkja is constructed.

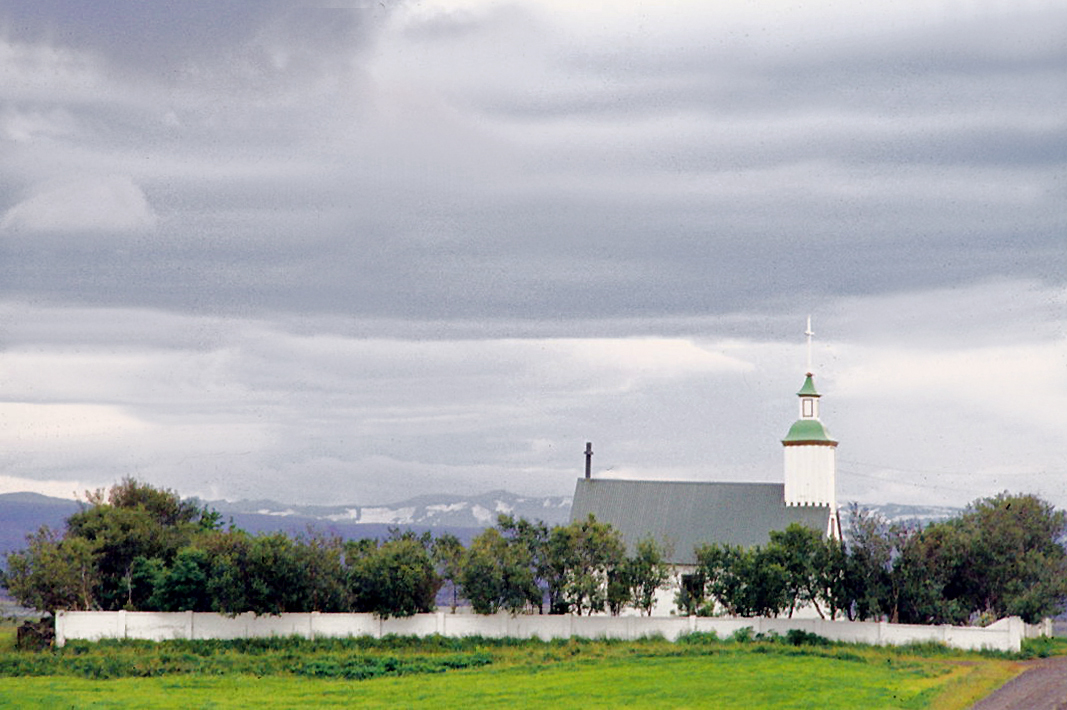
Skútustaðakirkja, constructed in 1862.

== Births ==
- Olafur Davidsson, natural scientist, ethnographer and folklore collector.
- Jón Stefánsson, scholar.
