= 1864 in Iceland =

- Decades: 1840s; 1850s; 1860s; 1870s; 1880s
- See also: Other events of 1864; Timeline of Icelandic history

Events in the year 1864 in Iceland.

== Incumbents ==
- Monarch: Christian IX
- Council President of Denmark:Ditlev Gothard Monrad (until 11 July); Christian Albrecht Bluhme onwards.
- Governor of Iceland: Þórður Jónassen

== Births ==
- October 31 − Einar Benediktsson, poet.
