= 1874 in Iceland =

- Decades: 1850s; 1860s; 1870s; 1880s; 1890s
- See also: Other events of 1874; Timeline of Icelandic history

Events in the year 1874 in Iceland.

== Incumbents ==
- Monarch: Christian IX
- Minister for Iceland: Christian Sophus Klein

== Events ==
- 5 January − The post of Minister for Iceland is established with Christian Sophus Klein being the first minister.
- The Danish krone was introduced to Iceland, replacing the earlier Danish currency, the rigsdaler.
- Denmark grants Iceland a constitution and limited home rule.
- Freedom of Religion is introduced in Iceland.
- Ísafold newspaper is founded.
- Reykjavik Women's Gymnasium is established.
- Þjóðhátíð is held for the first time.
