= 1860 in Iceland =

- Decades: 1840s; 1850s; 1860s; 1870s; 1880s
- See also: Other events of 1860; Timeline of Icelandic history

Events in the year 1860 in Iceland.

== Incumbents ==
- Monarch: Frederick VII of Denmark
- Council President of Denmark: Carl Edvard Rotwitt (until 8 February) Carl Frederik Blixen-Finecke (until 24 February) Carl Christian Hall onwards
- Governor of Iceland: Þórður Jónassen

== Births ==
- 4 April − Kristjan Niels Julius, poet.
- 4 May − Bogi Thorarensen Melsteð, historian.
