= 1887 in Iceland =

- Decades: 1860s; 1870s; 1880s; 1890s; 1900s
- See also: Other events of 1887; Timeline of Icelandic history

Events in the year 1887 in Iceland.

== Incumbents ==
- Monarch: Christian IX
- Minister for Iceland: Johannes Nellemann

== Events ==
- Grímsvötn erupted.

== Births ==
- 16 April – Guðjón Samúelsson, state architect
- 16 or 11 October – Stefán Sigurðsson, poet
