= 1888 in Iceland =

- Decades: 1860s; 1870s; 1880s; 1890s; 1900s
- See also: Other events of 1888; Timeline of Icelandic history

Events in the year 1888 in Iceland.

== Incumbents ==
- Monarch: Christian IX
- Minister for Iceland: Johannes Nellemann

== Events ==
- Strandarkirkja was constructed.

== Births ==
- 20 September – Ríkarður Jónsson, sculptor
- 8 June – Guðmundur Kamban, playwright

== Deaths ==
- 4 September – Jón Árnason, author
