= 1884 in Iceland =

- Decades: 1860s; 1870s; 1880s; 1890s; 1900s
- See also: Other events of 1884; Timeline of Icelandic history

Events in the year 1884 in Iceland.

== Incumbents ==
- Monarch: Christian IX
- Minister for Iceland: Johannes Nellemann

== Events ==
- The National Gallery of Iceland is founded in Copenhagen, Denmark.
