= 1876 in Iceland =

- Decades: 1850s; 1860s; 1870s; 1880s; 1890s
- See also: Other events of 1876; Timeline of Icelandic history

Events in the year 1876 in Iceland.

== Incumbents ==
- Monarch: Christian IX
- Minister for Iceland: Johannes Nellemann

== Events ==
- Frederik Johnstrup led an expedition to Iceland to study Askja and the volcanoes at Mývatn with Þorvaldur Thoroddsen (1855–1921) as his guide.

== Births ==
- 4 March − Ásgrímur Jónsson, painter
- 10 March − Edvard Eriksen, sculptor
