= 1885 in Iceland =

- Decades: 1860s; 1870s; 1880s; 1890s; 1900s
- See also: Other events of 1885; Timeline of Icelandic history

Events in the year 1885 in Iceland.

== Incumbents ==
- Monarch: Christian IX
- Minister for Iceland: Johannes Nellemann

== Events ==
- The National Bank (Landsbanki) is founded in Reykjavik.
- Iceland begins issuing its own Danish Krone banknotes.

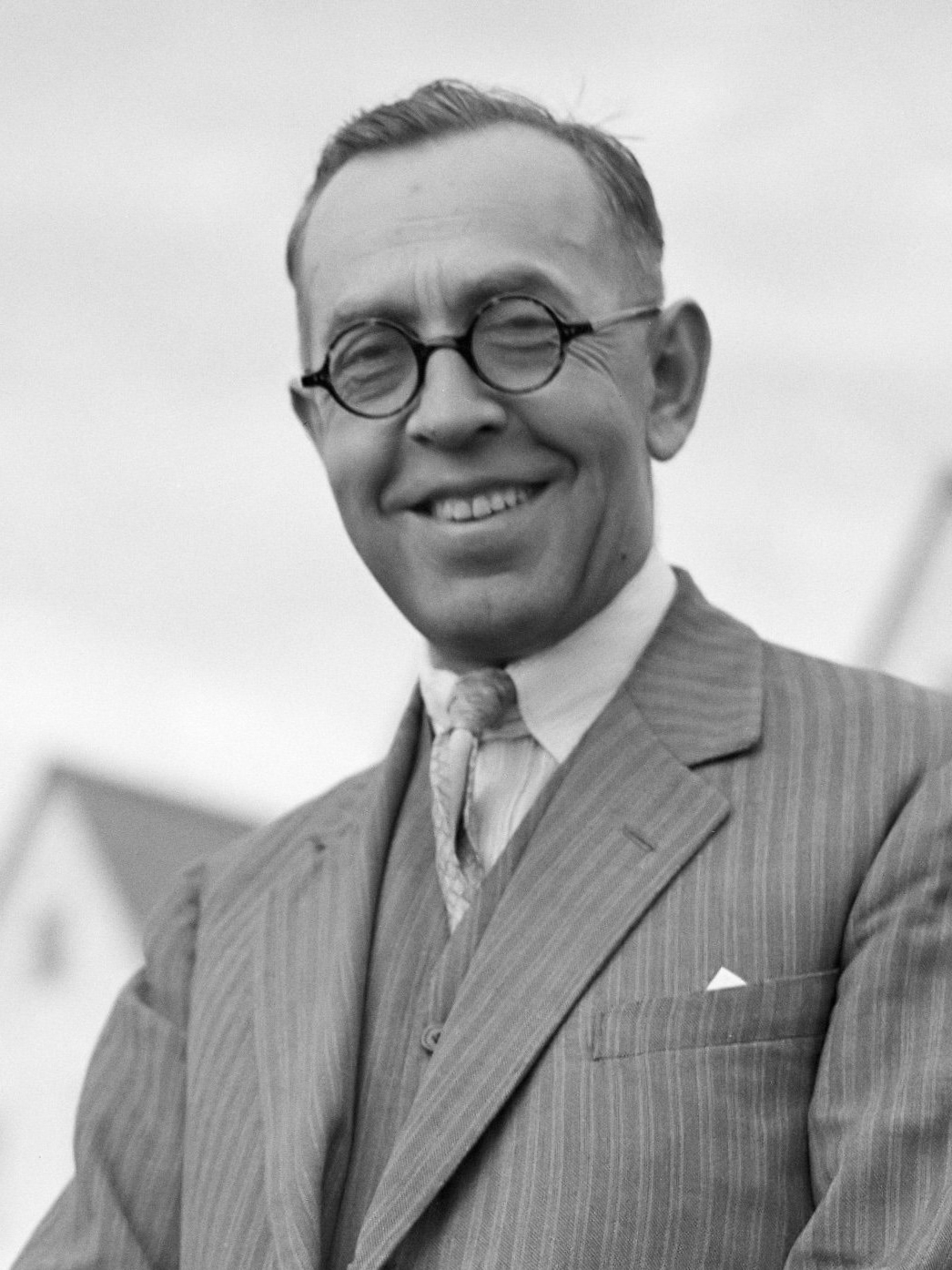
Jónas Jónsson

== Births ==
- 1 May – Jónas Jónsson, educator and politician.
- 15 October – Jóhannes Sveinsson Kjarval, painter.
