= Jóhannsson =

Jóhannsson is an Icelandic patronymic, meaning son of Jóhann. In Icelandic names, the name is not strictly a surname, as it is not a family name. The surname may refer to the following notable people:

- Árni Steinar Jóhannsson (1953–2015), Icelandic politician
- Aron Jóhannsson (born 1990), American-Icelandic soccer player
- Barði Jóhannsson (born 1975), Icelandic musician, singer, and composer
- Garðar Jóhannsson (born 1980), Icelandic professional football player
- Hans Jóhannsson (born 1957), Icelandic violin maker
- Jóhann Jóhannsson (1969–2018), Icelandic musician, composer, and producer
- Jóhann Páll Jóhannsson (born 1992), Icelandic politician
- Ingi Randver Jóhannsson (1936–2010), Icelandic chess player
- Kristján Jóhannsson (born 1948), Icelandic operatic tenor
