= Johanns =

Johanns is a surname and masculine given name of German origin, a patronymic from the personal name Johann, which is the German-language equivalent of John, meaning 'Yahweh is gracious'. Notable people with the name include:

== Surname ==
- Josef Johanns (born 1944), Luxembourgish racing cyclist
- Mike Johanns (born 1950), American attorney and politician
- Pierre Johanns (1882–1955), Luxembourgish Jesuit priest, missionary, and Indologist
- Stephanie Johanns, American politician and businessperson

== Given name ==
- Johanns Dulcien (born 1991), Chilean former footballer
