= 1875 in Iceland =

- Decades: 1850s; 1860s; 1870s; 1880s; 1890s
- See also: Other events of 1875; Timeline of Icelandic history

Events in the year 1875 in Iceland.

== Incumbents ==
- Monarch: Christian IX
- Minister for Iceland: Christian Sophus Klein (until 11 June); Johannes Nellemann onwards

== Events ==
- March 28/29 − Askja erupts
- Thorvaldsensfélagið is founded

== Births ==
- 1 March − Sigurður Eggerz, minister for Iceland
