= 1878 in Iceland =

- Decades: 1850s; 1860s; 1870s; 1880s; 1890s
- See also: Other events in 1878 · Timeline of Icelandic history

Events in the year 1878 in Iceland.

== Incumbents ==
- Monarch: Christian IX
- Minister for Iceland: Johannes Nellemann

== Events ==
- The original Reykjanesviti structure was constructed.
- 1878 – Krakatindur east of Hekla erupts. (Part of the East volcanic zone (EVZ))

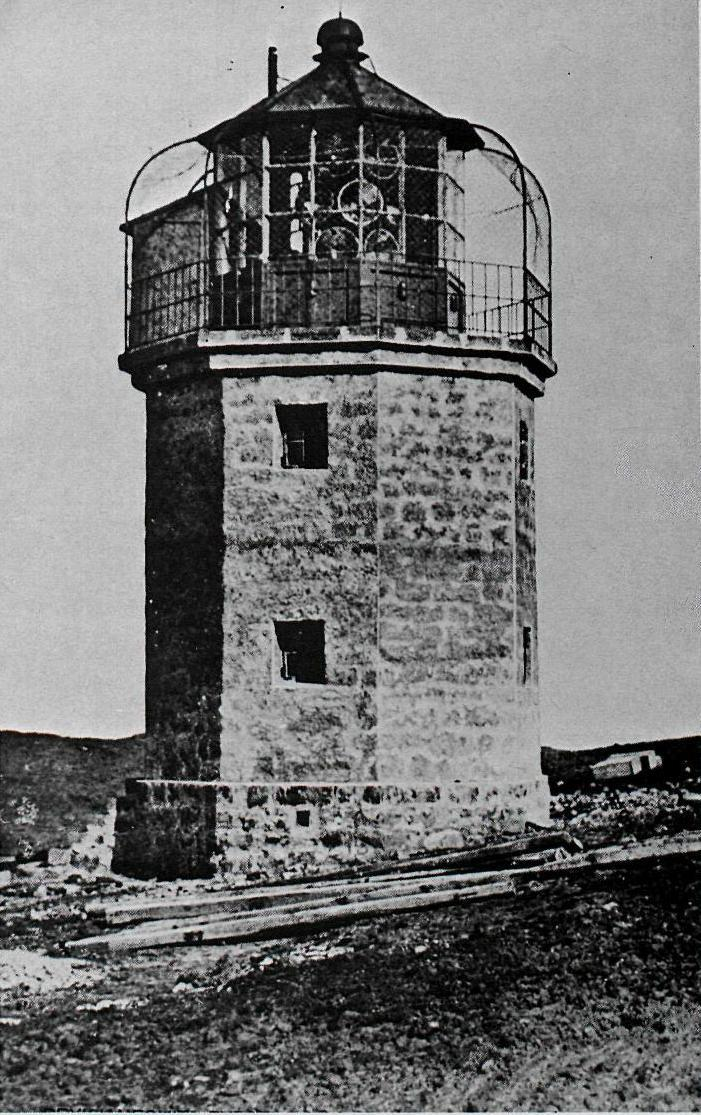
Reykjanesviti, constructed in 1878
