= 1877 in Iceland =

- Decades: 1850s; 1860s; 1870s; 1880s; 1890s
- See also: Other events in 1877 · Timeline of Icelandic history

Events in the year 1877 in Iceland.

== Incumbents ==
- Monarch: Christian IX
- Minister for Iceland: Johannes Nellemann

== Births ==
- 3 March − Jón Þorláksson, prime minister of Iceland.

== Deaths ==
- 2 February − Gísli Konráðsson, folklorist
