= 1881 in Iceland =

- Decades: 1860s; 1870s; 1880s; 1890s; 1900s
- See also: Other events of 1881; Timeline of Icelandic history

Events in the year 1881 in Iceland.

== Incumbents ==
- Monarch: Christian IX
- Minister for Iceland: Johannes Nellemann

== Events ==
- The Alþingishúsið (The Parliament House) is constructed.

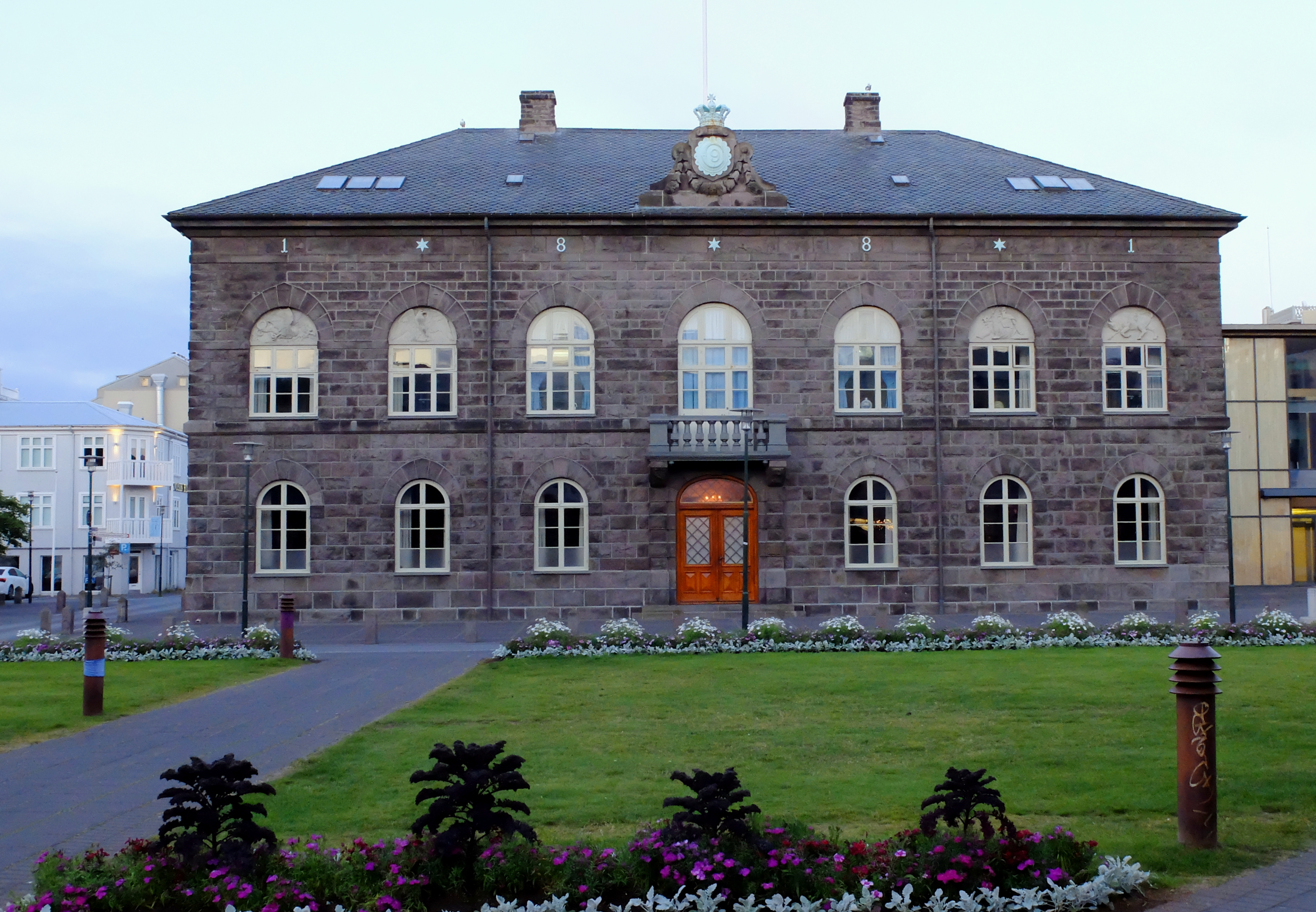
Alþingishúsið constructed in 1881

== Births ==
- 13 January – Sigvaldi Kaldalóns, composer
- 27 February – Sveinn Björnsson, first President of Iceland.
- 6 August – Hulda, poet
- Jón Stefánsson, landscape artist
