= 1880 in Iceland =

- Decades: 1860s; 1870s; 1880s; 1890s; 1900s
- See also: Other events of 1880; Timeline of Icelandic history

Events in the year 1880 in Iceland.

== Incumbents ==
- Monarch: Christian IX
- Minister for Iceland: Johannes Nellemann

== Events ==
- May – The funeral of Icelandic independence movement leader Jón Sigurðsson takes place.

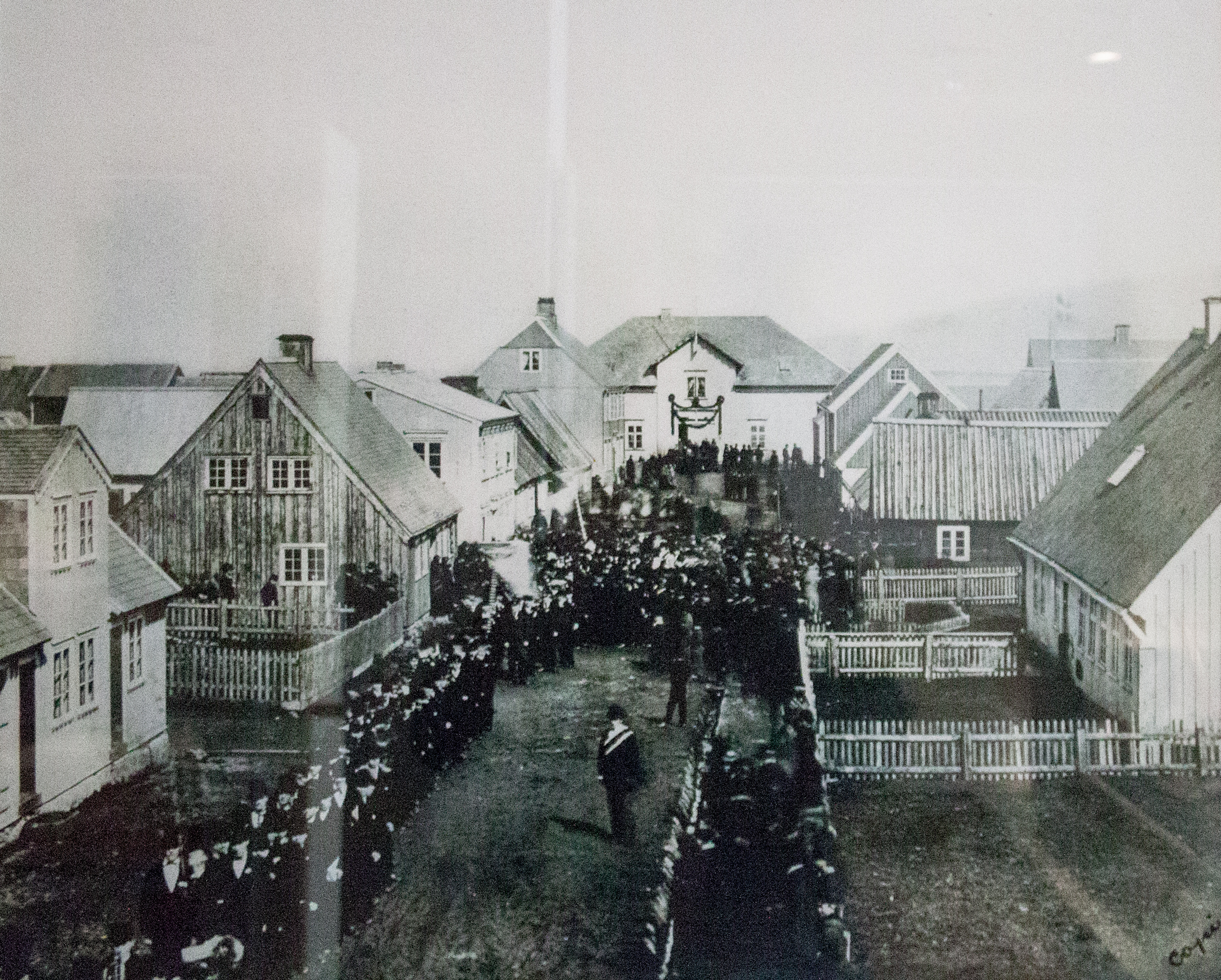
Funeral procession of Jón Sigurdsson in May 1880. He was the leader of the 19th century Icelandic independence movement.

== Births ==
- 8 January – Guðrún Lárusdóttir, politician
- 24 February – Einar Arnórsson, politician
- 5 April – Þorsteinn Þorsteinsson, economist
- 19 June – Jóhann Sigurjónsson, playwright
