= 1879 in Iceland =

- Decades: 1850s; 1860s; 1870s; 1880s; 1890s
- See also: Other events of 1879; Timeline of Icelandic history

Events in the year 1879 in Iceland.

== Incumbents ==
- Monarch: Christian IX
- Minister for Iceland: Johannes Nellemann

== Events ==
- Geirfuglasker erupts (submarine).

== Births ==
- 6 February – Magnús Guðmundsson, politician
- 6 February – Björn Þórðarson, prime minister of Iceland

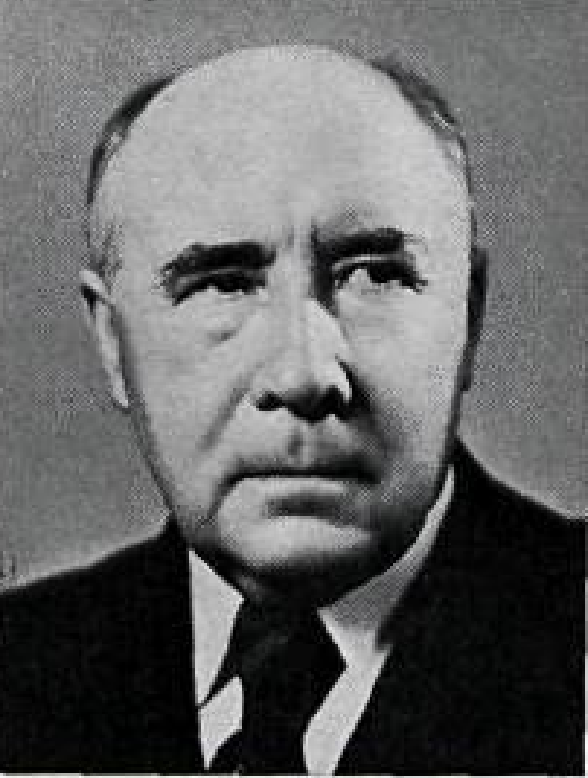
Björn Þórðarson

== Deaths ==
- 19 June – Vilhelmína Lever, 77, shopkeeper
- 7 December – Jón Sigurðsson, 68, leader of the Icelandic independence movement.
