= Johann Georg =

- Gender: Male

Origin
- Region of origin: Germanic

Other names
- Related names: Johan George

The German given name Johann Georg, or its variant spellings, may refer to:

== John George ==
- John George, Elector of Brandenburg (1525–1598)
- John George I, Elector of Saxony (1585–1656)
- John George II, Elector of Saxony (1613–1680)
- John George III, Elector of Saxony (1647–1691)
- John George IV, Elector of Saxony (1668–1694)
- Johann Georg Abicht (1672–1740), German Lutheran theologian
- Johann Georg Albrechtsberger (1736–1809), Austrian musician
- Johann Georg Baiter (1801–1877), Swiss philologist and textual critic
- Johann-Georg Bendl (before 1620 – 1680), Baroque sculptor mainly at work in Prague
- Johann Georg Bergmüller (1688–1762), Bavarian painter, particularly of frescoes of the Baroque
- Johann Georg Bodmer (1786–1864), Swiss inventor
- Johann Georg, Chevalier de Saxe (1704–1774), Saxonian General and Governor of Dresden
- Johann Georg Christian Lehmann (1792–1860), German botanist
- Johann Georg, Duke of Saxe-Weissenfels (1677–1712), duke of Saxe-Weissenfels-Querfurt and a member of the House of Wettin
- Johann Georg Estor (1699–1773), German theorist of public law, historian and book collector
- Johann Georg Faust (1466? – c. 1540), itinerant alchemist, astrologer and magician of the German Renaissance
- Johann Georg Fischer (1816–1897), German poet and playwright
- Johann Georg Gichtel (1638–1710), German mystic
- Johann Georg Gmelin (1709–1755), German naturalist, botanist and geographer
- Johann Georg Graevius (1632–1703), German classical scholar and critic
- Johann Georg Grasel (1790–1818), leader of a robber's gang, his name is used in Czech as common term for rascal or villain
- Johann Georg Hagen (1847–1930), German astronomer and Catholic priest
- Johann Georg Hamann (1730–1788), philosopher of the German (Counter-)Enlightenment
- Johann Georg Heine (1771–1838), German orthopedic mechanic and physician
- Johann Georg Hiedler (1792–1857), German, considered the officially accepted grandfather of Adolf Hitler by the Third Reich
- Johann Georg Jacobi (1740–1814), German poet
- Johann Georg Krünitz (1728–1796), German encyclopedist
- Johann Georg Palitzsch (1723–1788), German astronomer
- Johann Georg Pisendel (1687–1755), German Baroque musician, violinist and composer
- Johann Georg Repsold (1770–1830), German astronomer
- Johann Georg Ritter von Zimmermann
- Johann Georg Specht (1728–1795), Swiss philosophical writer and physician
- Johann Georg Sulzer (1720–1779), Swiss professor of mathematics, who later on moved on to the field of electricity
- Johann Georg Tralles (1763–1822), German mathematician and physicist
- Johann Georg von Brandenburg (1577–1624), German nobleman
- Johann Georg von Eckhart (1664–1730), German historian
- Johann Georg von Hahn (1811–1869), Austrian diplomat, philologist and specialist in Albanian history, language and culture
- Johann Georg von Soldner (1776–1833), German physicist, mathematician and astronomer
- Johann Georg Wagler (1800–1832), German herpetologist
- Johann Georg Walch (1693–1775), German theologian
- Johann Georg Wirsung (1589–1643), German anatomist

== Johann George ==
- Johann George Moeresius
- Johann George Tromlitz

== See also ==
- Georg (given name)
- Johan (given name)
- Johann
