= 1883 in Iceland =

- Decades: 1860s; 1870s; 1880s; 1890s; 1900s
- See also: Other events of 1883; Timeline of Icelandic history

Events in the year 1883 in Iceland.

== Incumbents ==
- Monarch: Christian IX
- Minister for Iceland: Johannes Nellemann

== Events ==
- Hofskirkja is constructed in Hof in South Iceland.
- Grímsvötn erupts.

== Births ==
- 24 August – Thorbergur Thorvaldson, chemist.
- 15 April – Gordon Sigurjonsson, athlete.

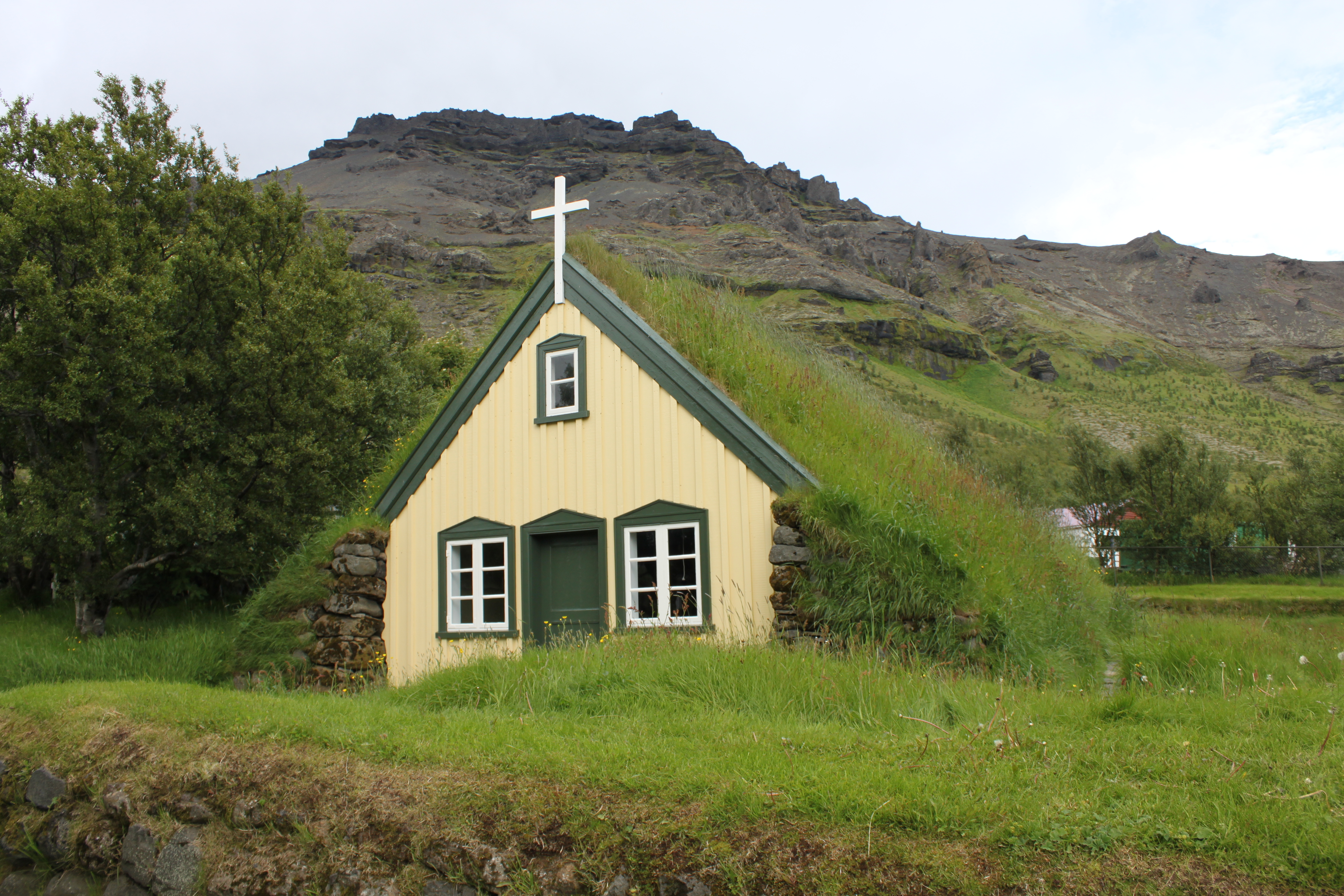
Hofskirkja, constructed 1883-1885.
