= Rynoltice =

- Municipality
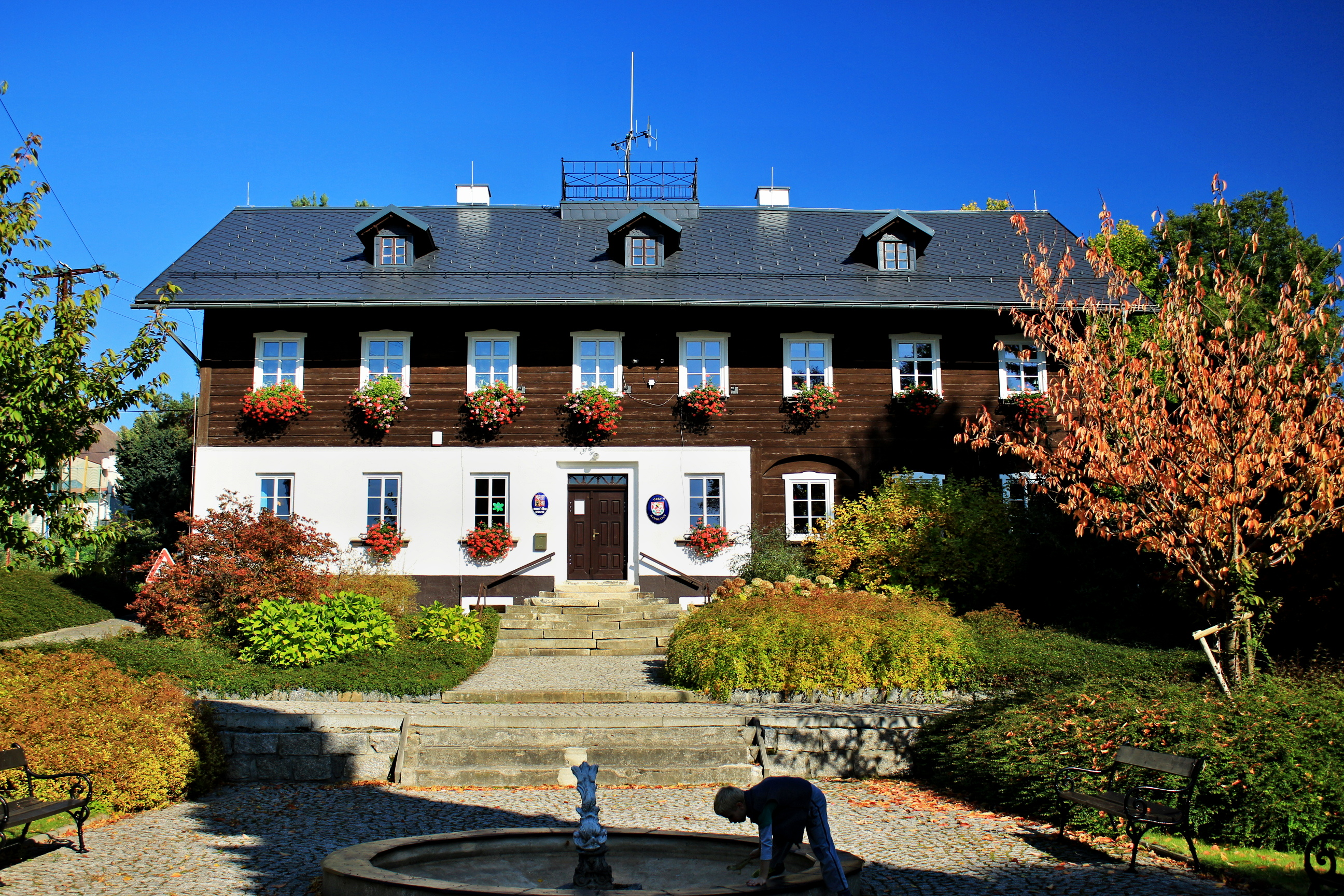
- Municipal office

- Flag Coat of arms

- Location in the Czech Republic
- Coordinates: 50°47′21″N 14°49′8″E
- Country: Czech Republic
- Region: Liberec
- District: Liberec
- First mentioned: 1364

Area
  - Total: 17.72 km^{2} (6.84 sq mi)
- Elevation: 340 m (1,120 ft)

Population (2026-01-01)
  - Total: 861
  - Density: 48.6/km^{2} (126/sq mi)
- Time zone: UTC+1 (CET)
  - Summer (DST): UTC+2 (CEST)
- Postal code: 463 53
- Website: www.rynoltice.cz

Rynoltice (German: Ringelshain) is a municipality and village in Liberec District in the Liberec Region of the Czech Republic. It has about 900 inhabitants.

== Administrative division ==
Rynoltice consists of five municipal parts (in brackets population according to the 2021 census):

- Rynoltice (454)
- Černá Louže (28)
- Jítrava (201)
- Nová Starost (25)
- Polesí (79)

== Etymology ==
The name Rynoltice is derived from the personal name Rýnolt/Rejnholt (a Czech form of the German name Raginwald), meaning "the village of Rýnolt's/Rejnholt's people".

== Geography ==
Rynoltice is located about 16 kilometres (10 mi) west of Liberec. It lies mostly in the Ralsko Uplands. The western part of the municipal territory extends into the Ještěd–Kozákov Ridge and includes the highest point of Rynoltice, the Vápenný mountain at 790 m (2,590 ft) above sea level. The stream Panenský potok originates on the slopes of Vápenný and then flows across the municipality.

== History ==
The first written mention of Rynoltice is from 1364. The village was founded in the 13th century by German colonists. During the Hussite Wars, the village was ransacked. It was resettled in 1563.

== Demographics ==
Historical population

Year	Pop.	±%
1869	3,023	—
1880	2,814	−6.9%
1890	2,556	−9.2%
1900	2,403	−6.0%
1910	2,274	−5.4%

Year	Pop.	±%
1921	2,049	−9.9%
1930	2,070	+1.0%
1950	1,116	−46.1%
1961	1,105	−1.0%
1970	932	−15.7%

Year	Pop.	±%
1980	793	−14.9%
1991	719	−9.3%
2001	722	+0.4%
2011	739	+2.4%
2021	787	+6.5%

Source: Censuses

== Transport ==
The I/13 road (the section from Liberec to Děčín, which is a part of the European route E442) runs through the municipality.

Rynoltice is located on the railway line Liberec–Děčín.

== Sights ==
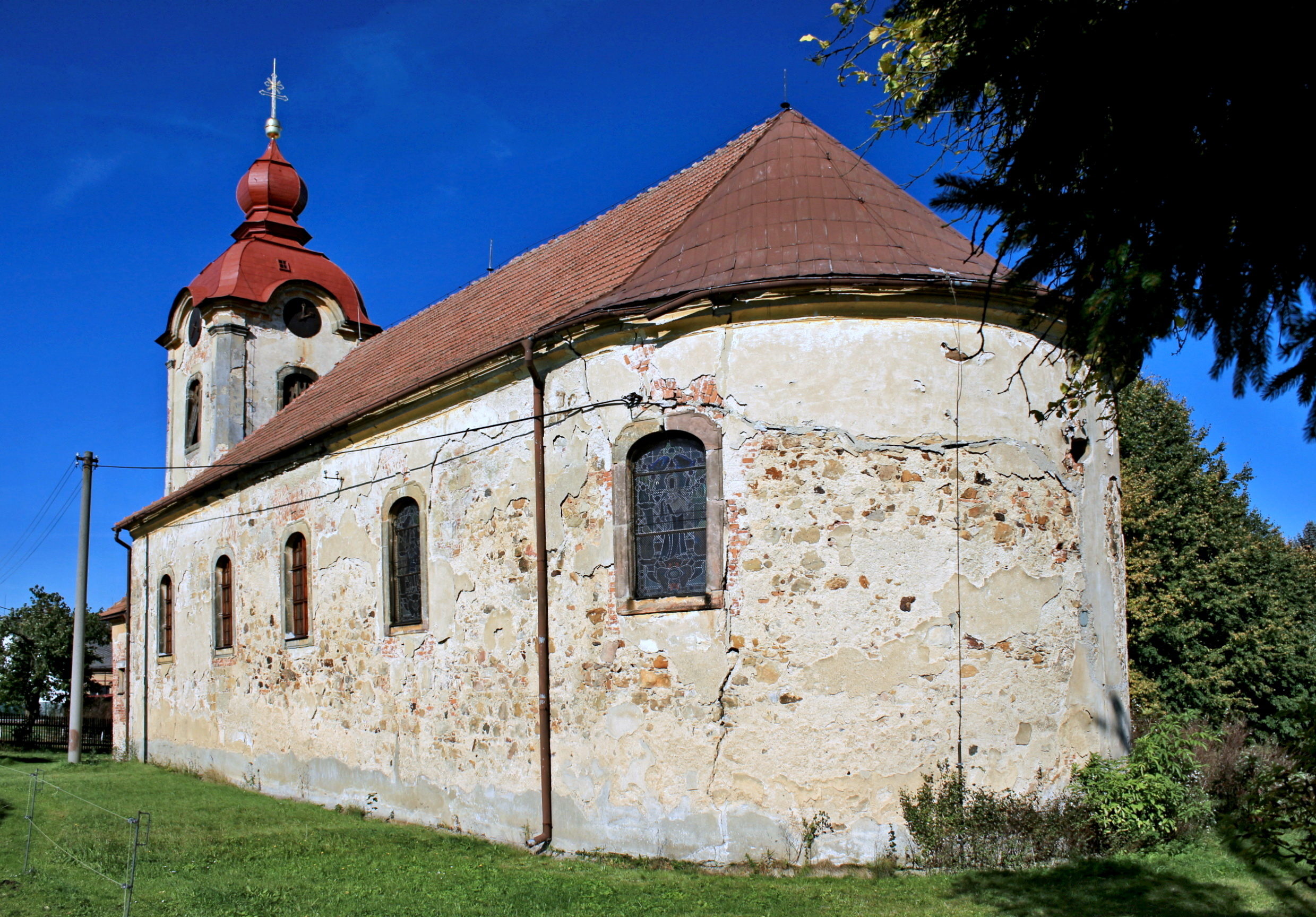
Church of Saint Barbara

The main landmark of Rynoltice is the Church of Saint Barbara. It dates from the second half of the 17th century. In the mid-18th century, it was modified to its present form.

The Church of Saint Pancras is located in Jítrava. It was built in 1710 on the site of an older wooden church.

== Notable people ==
- Johann Schicht (1855–1907), Czech-German entrepreneur
