= 1873 in Iceland =

- Decades: 1850s; 1860s; 1870s; 1880s; 1890s
- See also: Other events of 1873; Timeline of Icelandic history

Events in the year 1873 in Iceland.

== Incumbents ==
- Monarch: Christian IX
- Council President of Denmark: Ludvig Holstein-Holsteinborg

== Events ==
- Skautafélag Reykjavíkur is founded.
- The first Icelandic postage stamps were published in Iceland.

== Births ==
- 6 June − Guðmundur Finnbogason, philosopher
