= Johann Schicht =

Czech entrepreneur

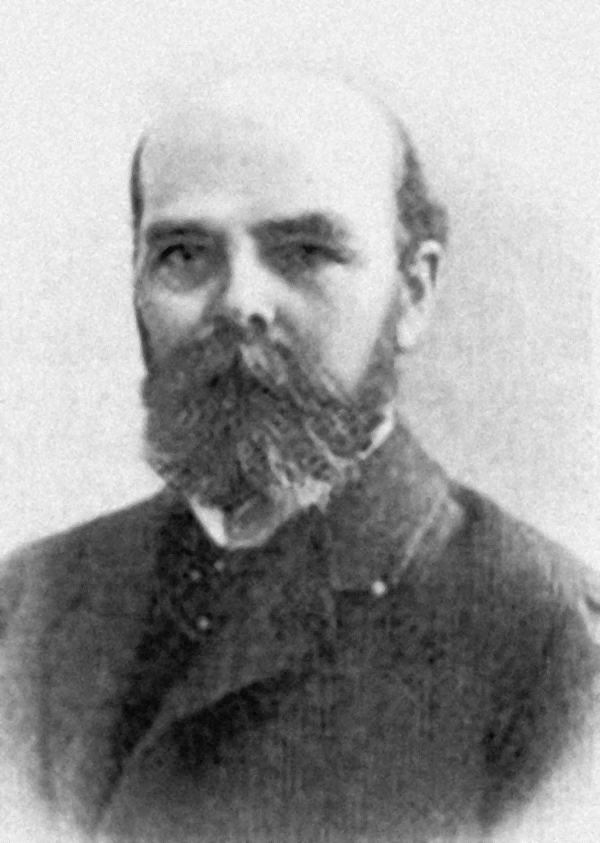
Johann Schicht

Johann Schicht (8 March 1855, in Ringelshain (Rynoltice), Royal Bohemia, Austrian Empire – 3 June 1907, in Aussig (Ústí nad Labem), Bohemia) was a German Bohemian entrepreneur, owner of a large soap-making plant.

== Biography ==
Johann's father, farmer and butcher Georg Schicht, started to produce soap in his house in Rynoltice in 1848. Commercial success allowed him to buy a new house and in 1867 to set a soap boiling plant. In 1878 he handed the factory, named "Georg Schicht", to his four sons. The name was kept as a trademark until 1951.

Johann Schicht, the oldest son, most competent and skilled, suggested in 1873 moving the factory into Ústí nad Labem to reduce problems with transportation of bulk raw material. Then he took the chance to realise his plans and in 1880 a new soap-making plant was built between the villages of Kramoly and Novosedlice, in what is today Střekov, part of Ústí nad Labem.

Since 1885 the small company (12 employees) grew rapidly, selling among others candles, margarine, water glass, stearin and glycerin. Very popular was their "soap with a stag" (mýdlo s jelenem), produced since the end of 19th century until 2002. As an adversary of alcoholism Schicht started production of fruit juice named "Ceres saft". The brand name "Ceres" (after a Roman goddess) was used for several food products and is seen until today.

The company established its own mechanical engineering plant and a forge, operated coal mines and power plant and invested in range of companies in chemical and food processing industry. A branch in Moravská Ostrava was set up in 1906.

Because of health problems Johann Schicht changed, in 1906, the family business into a joint-stock company (members of Schicht family owned 80%). At the moment of Schicht's death in 1907 the concern employed over 1,800 people. Heinrich Schicht, son of Johann, followed as the company's president.

Johann Schicht was an active member of many commercial and cultural clubs and associations. In 1898 he was awarded with the title of Imperial Councilor for his contribution to the development of industry in Austria-Hungary. Schicht had been compared to other Czech industrialists Tomáš Baťa and Emil Škoda; like them he tried to build a large integrated business empire, provided extensive social care for the employees and used modern technology, management and marketing to stay ahead of competition.
