= Johann Adam Remele =

German painter

Johann Adam Remele (died 1740) was a German court painter who was active in Würzburg.

== Gallery ==
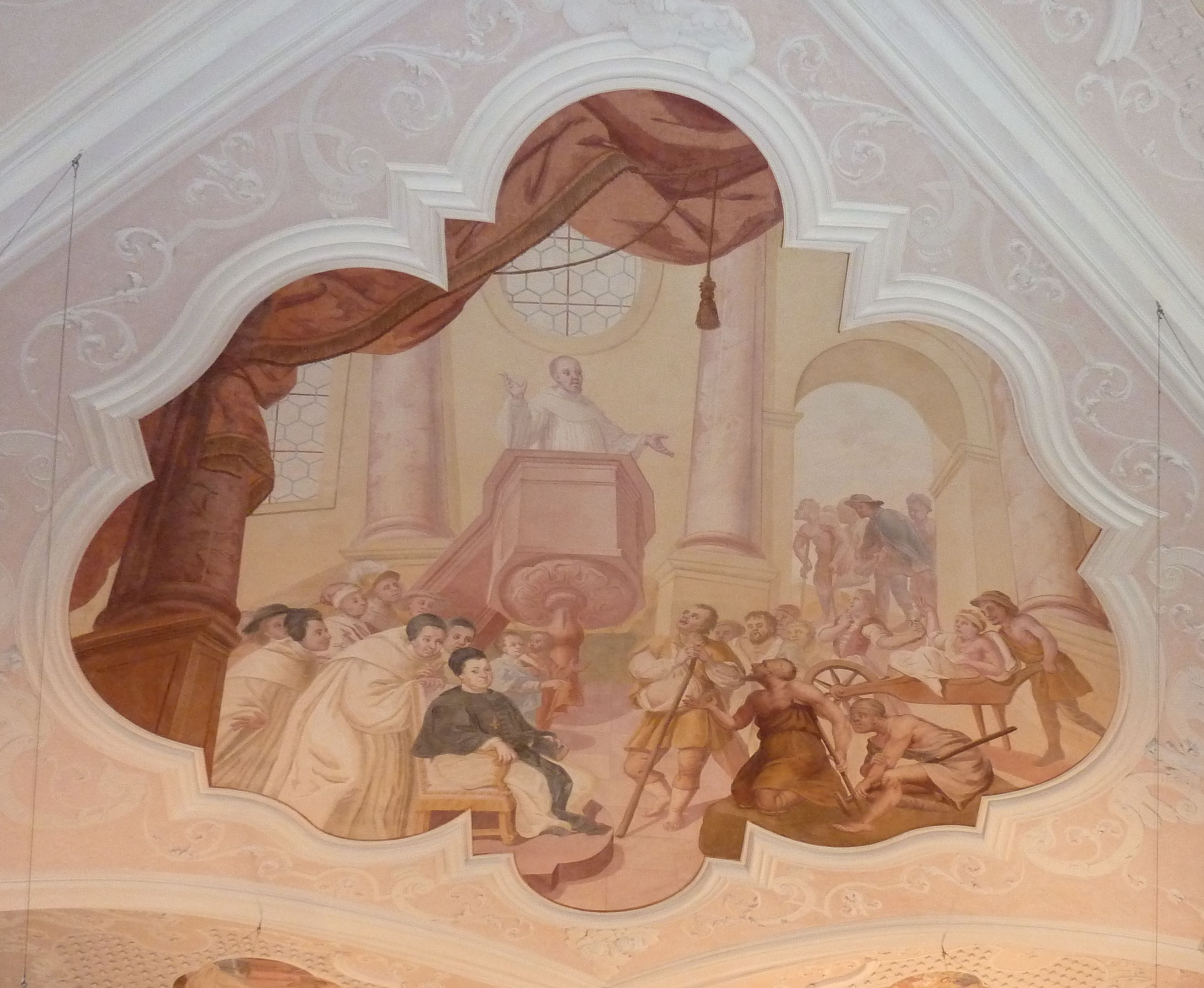

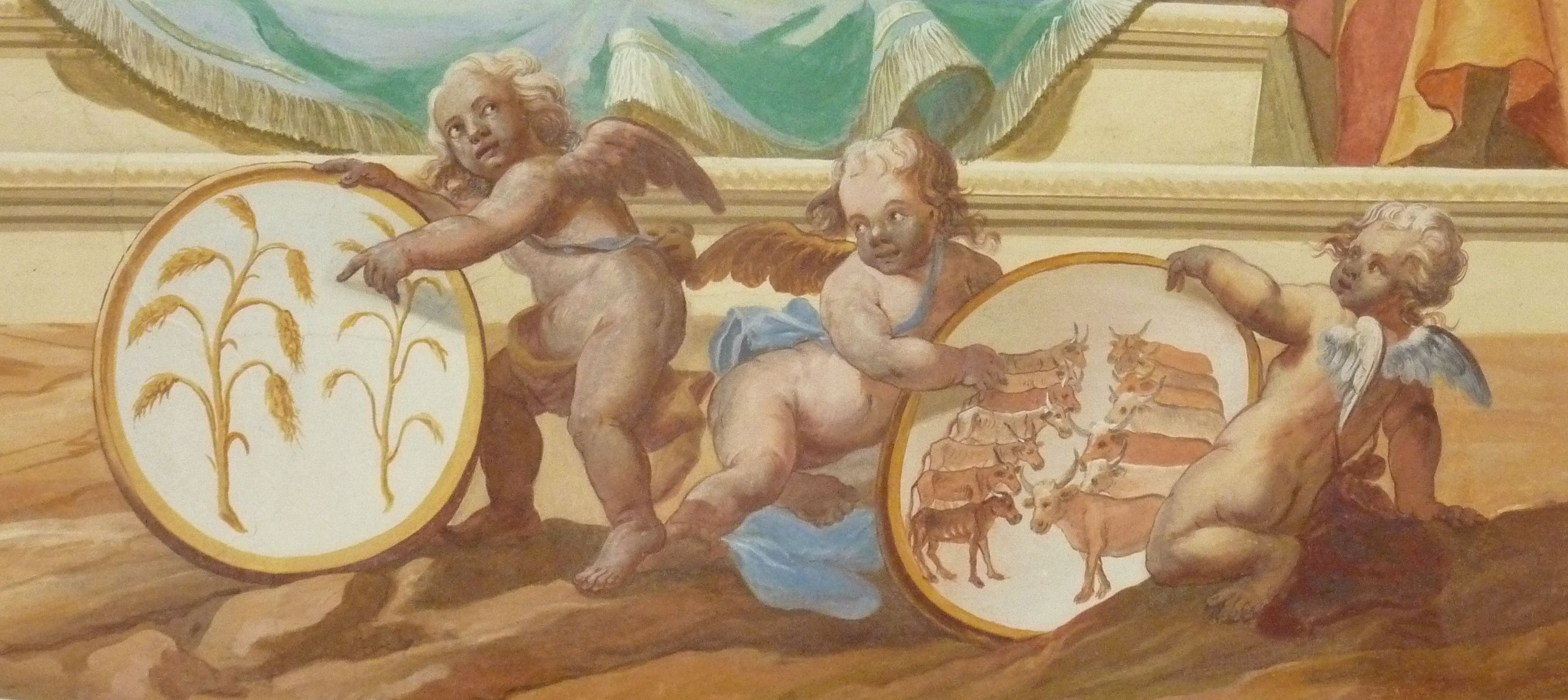

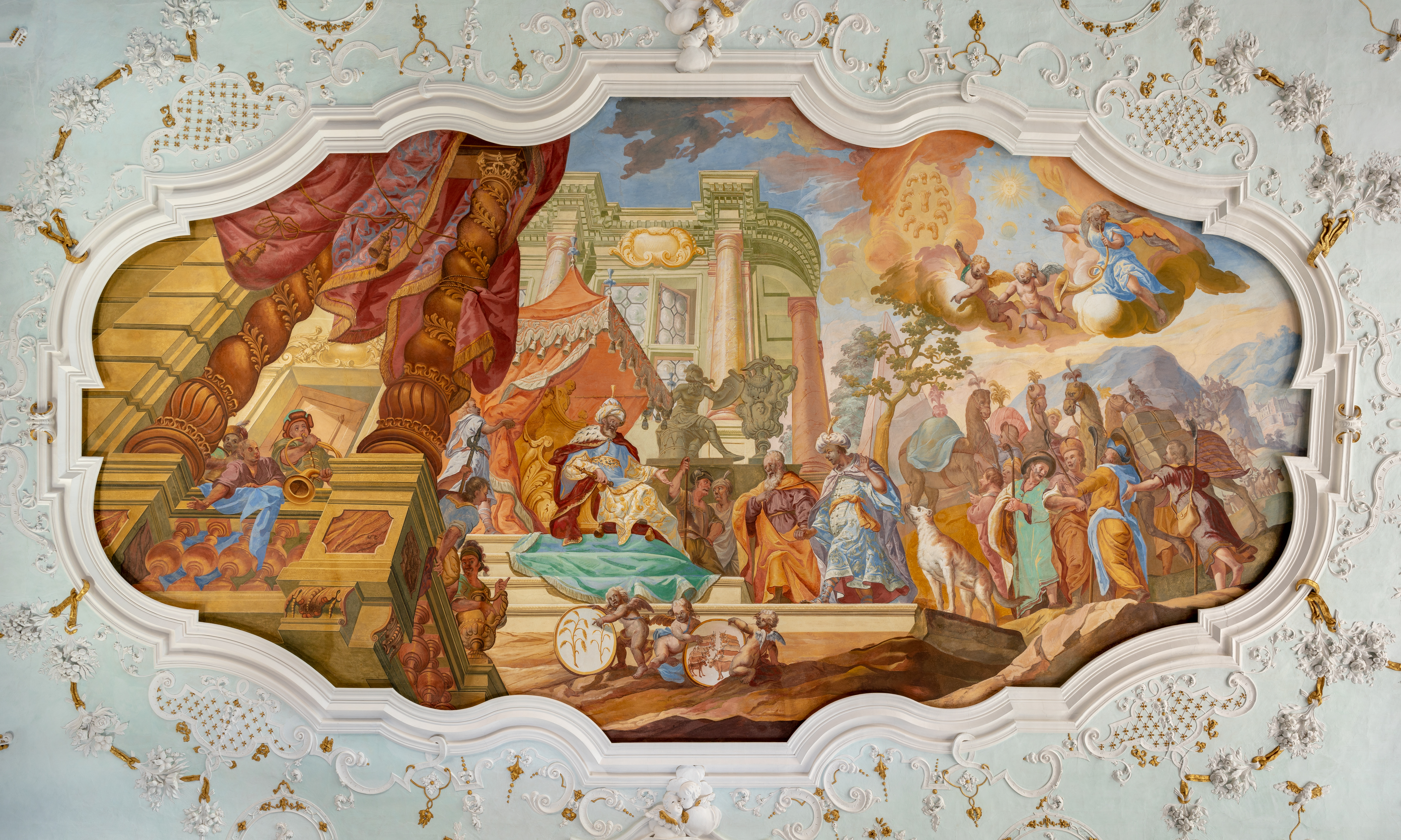
