= Björg Thorarensen =

Icelandic academic

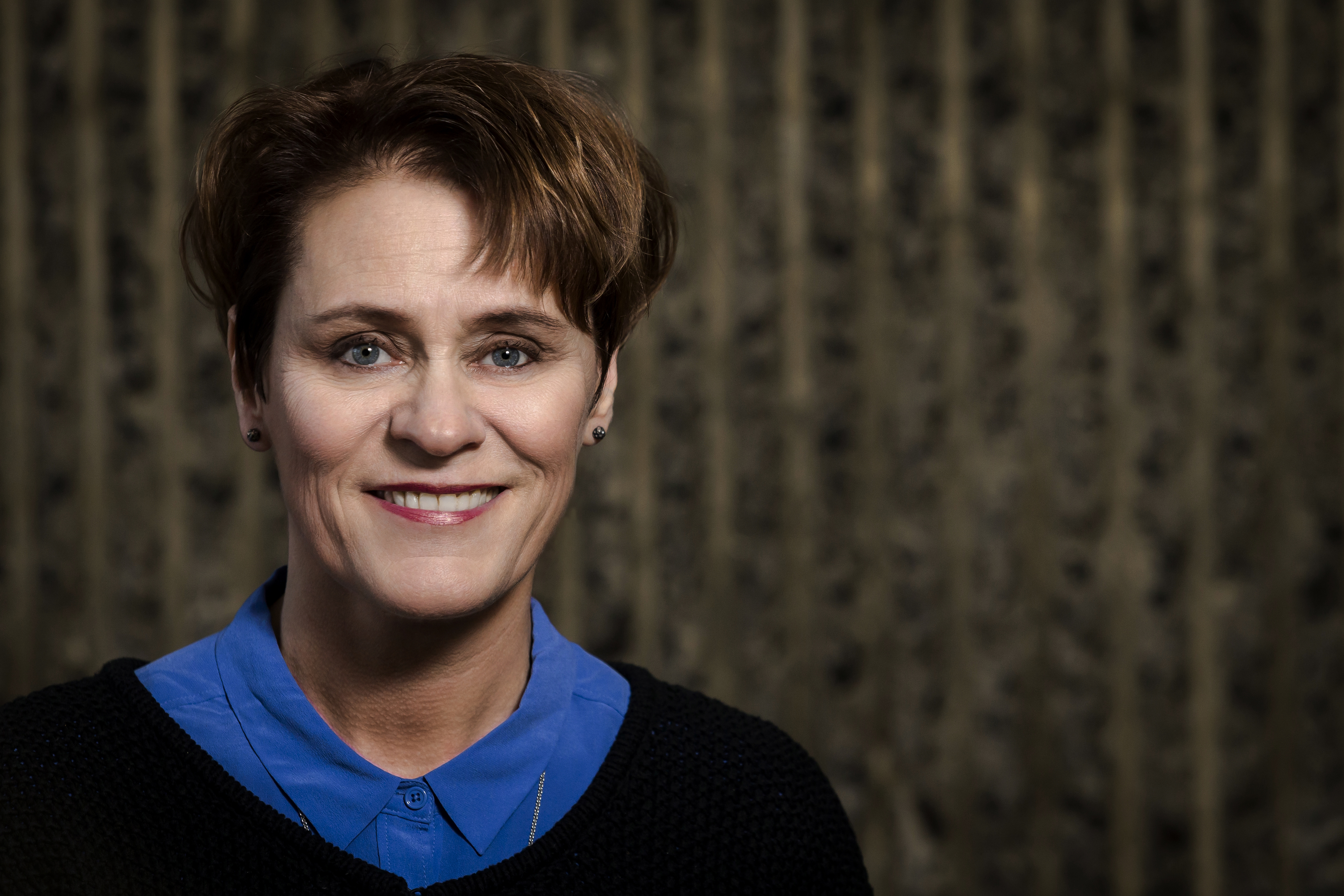
- Born: 1966 (age 59–60)
- Occupation: professor of law in the Faculty of Law at the University of Iceland

Björg Thorarensen (born 1966) is Professor of Law in the Faculty of Law at the University of Iceland.

== Professional career ==
Björg was born in Reykjavik on 24 September 1966. She completed a matriculation examination from Menntaskólinn í Reykjavík in 1985, Cand. Jur. degree from the Faculty of Law at the University of Iceland in 1991 and an LL.M. degree from the University of Edinburgh in 1993 in Constitutional Law, Human Rights Law and Institutions of the EU.

After completing her law examination, Björg became an employee of a committee under the auspices of the Ministry of Justice which from 1991 to 1992 prepared the adoption of Act no. 92/1989 on the Separation of District Judicial and Administrative Powers on 1 July 1992. She was an intern at the European Commission on Human Rights in Strasbourg in the fall of 1993. She worked as a lawyer in the legal office of the Ministry of Justice during the period 1994–1996, was Director of Police and Judicial Affairs during 1996–2001 and Director of Legal Affairs at the Ministry of Justice in 2002. Björg was admitted to the Bar in 1997. She also served as Agent of the Government of Iceland to the European Court of Human Rights during 1999–2005 and 2009–2011.

During the period 1994–2002, Björg was a part-time lecturer in the Faculty of Law at the University of Iceland in international rules of human rights and constitutional law. She has been a professor in the Faculty of Law at the University of Iceland in constitutional law, international rules of human rights and international law from 2002, and during 2007–2010, she served as Dean of the Faculty of Law.

The teaching and research of Björg are mostly in the areas of constitutional law, European rules of human rights, international law and data protection law, and she has published numerous articles, book chapters and books in domestic and international forums on these matters, as well as advisory opinions, reports and work on proposed bills. Her most comprehensive research is in connection with the Icelandic Constitution and the constitutional system of the Nordic Countries.

Björg has held lectures on matters in her fields of research at numerous international and domestic conferences and symposiums. She is furthermore an active public commentator on constitutional and human rights issues. She was a visiting fellow in the Faculty of Law at the University of Copenhagen in 2011 and 2014 and at the European University Institute in 2018.

== Various tasks and projects ==
Björg has held numerous commissions of trust both within and outside the university. She has been chair of the board of the Data Protection Authority since 2011 and was chair of a work group of the Minister of Justice to prepare for adoption of the EU Data Protection Regulation into Icelandic law in 2017 and 2018. Here can also be mentioned chairmanship at University of Iceland Press from 2016 and the Law of the Sea Institute of Iceland from 2017, and she furthermore served as chair of the board of the Human Rights Institute of the University of Iceland during the period 2004–2013. Björg has served on the board of the Icelandic Literary Society from 2019. She was voted by Althing to the Constitutional Commission for 2010 and 2011

Björg was appointed by the Minister for Foreign Affairs on 4 November 2009 as one of two Deputy Chairs of the Negotiation Committee on Iceland's accession to the EU. She was also Chair of the Advisory Committee to the Government on the Revision of the Constitution of Iceland in 2009 and was appointed by the Prime Minister to a Committee of Experts for the Revision of the Constitution, 2005–2007. She serves on the Consultative Committee of the Convention for the Protection of Individuals with regard to Automatic Processing of Personal Data (T-PD). From 1995 to 2010, Björg was a representative of Iceland in various committees under the auspices of the Council of Europe in Strasbourg, particularly in the field of human rights, for example, in the Committee of Experts for the Development of Human Rights (DH-DEV) and the Committee of Experts for the Improvement of Procedures for the Protection of Human Rights (DH-PR) where she served as chair in 2009 and 2010. She was furthermore the representative of Iceland in the negotiation group of the Council of Europe and European Union on the accession of the EU to the European Convention on Human Rights in 2010 og 2011.

Björg also worked in news reporting at NT and the newspaper Tíminn 1985 and 1986, the newspaper Vísir in 1986 and 1987 and the news room of the Icelandic State Broadcasting Service (RÚV) during the period 1988–1991.

== Recognitions ==
Björg was awarded the insignia of the Icelandic Order of the Falcon on New Year's Day 2019 for teaching and research in the field of law.

== Personal life ==
The parents of Björg are Sigurlaug Bjarnadóttir, upper secondary school teacher and former member of Althing (born 1926), and Þorsteinn Thorarensen, lawyer and book publisher (1927–2006). Her siblings are Ingunn, primary school teacher (born 1955), and Björn, computer scientist and musician (born 1962). Björg is married to Markús Sigurbjörnsson, judge of the Supreme Court (born 1954), and they have three children.

== Research and main writings ==
- Stjórnskipunarréttur. Undirstöður og handhafar ríkisvalds (2015)
- Stjórnskipunarréttur. Mannréttindi (2019, 2. útg.).
- Nordic Constitutions. A Comparative and Contextual Study (2018).
- Þjóðaréttur (2011)
- Um lög og rétt. Helstu greinar íslenskrar lögfræði (2017, 3. útg.)
- Mannréttindasamningar Sameinuðu Þjóðanna - Meginreglur framkvæmd og áhrif á íslenskan rétt (2009)
- Mannréttindasáttmáli Evrópu. Meginreglur, framkvæmd og áhrif á íslenskn rétt (2017, 2. útg.).
- Participatory Constitutional Change. The People as Amenders of the Constitution (2017)
- Iceland's Financial Crisis. The Politics of Blame, Protest, and Reconstruction (2016)
- Constitutions in the Global Financial Crisis. A Comparative Analysis (2013)
- "Why the making of a crowd-sourced Constitution in Iceland failed" (2014).
