= Freedom of religion in Iceland =

Freedom of religion in Iceland is guaranteed by the 64th article of the Constitution of Iceland. However at the same time the 62nd article states that the Evangelical Lutheran Church shall be the national church (þjóðkirkja) and the national curriculum places emphasis on Christian studies.

A "church tax" is collected by the government and is paid out to churches and religious groups according to the number of members. Those who are registered as non-religious (not belonging to any religious group) also pay the tax, which is used to support the University of Iceland.

The national curriculum requires special classes on Christian studies from first grade, other religions are also mentioned.

Babies are registered at birth with the same religious affiliation as their parents. If their parents are married and belong to different religious groups, the babies are not registered in any church until the parents agree on how to register them. If the parents are not married when the child is born, the baby is registered with the same affiliation as the parent who has custody of the child.

In 2022, there were 3 antisemitic incidences reported to the police.

In 2023, the country was scored 4 out of 4 for religious freedom.

== See also ==
- Religion in Iceland
