= Stara Cerkev =

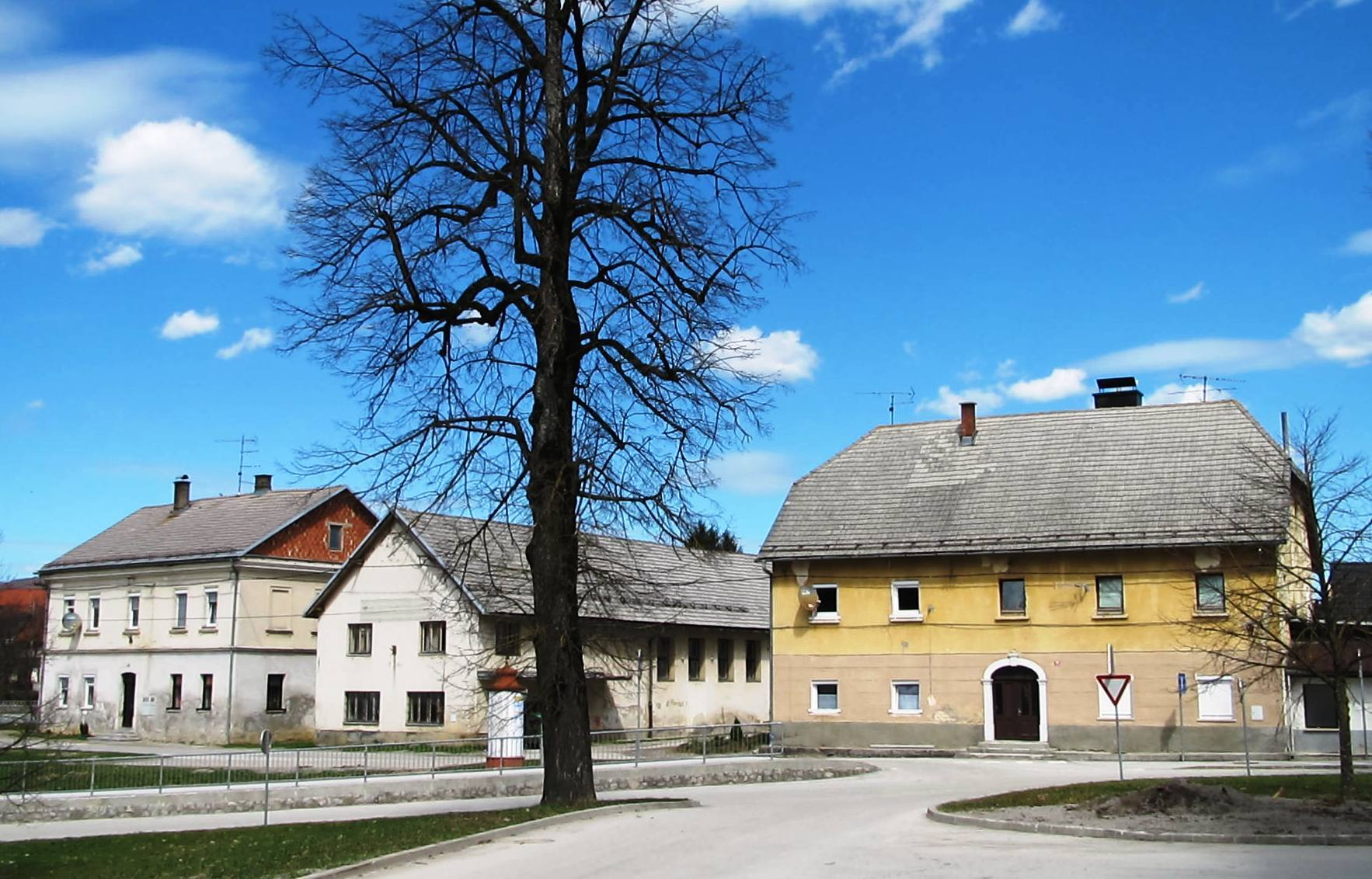

- Location in Slovenia
- Coordinates: 45°40′10.13″N 14°50′23.77″E
- Country: Slovenia
- Traditional region: Lower Carniola
- Statistical region: Southeast Slovenia
- Municipality: Kočevje

Area
  - Total: 0.82 km^{2} (0.32 sq mi)
- Elevation: 477.2 m (1,566 ft)

Population (2002)
  - Total: 285
- Postal code: 1332

Stara Cerkev (pronounced [ˈstaːɾa ˈtseːɾkɛu̯]; in older sources also Srednja vas, German: Mitterdorf) is a village northwest of Kočevje in southern Slovenia. The area is part of the traditional region of Lower Carniola and is now included in the Southeast Slovenia Statistical Region.

== Name ==
The Slovene name Stara Cerkev (literally, 'old church') refers to the original church in the settlement, which was dedicated to the Virgin Mary and built before 1339. The name was applied to differentiate it from the newer Saint Bartholomew's Church in Kočevje (or Mahovnik at the time, which also included Kočevje), built in 1339.

== History ==
Stara Cerkev is one of the oldest settlements in the Kočevje region. It was founded by ethnically Slovene settlers. In 1574 the settlement had six full farms that were subdivided into 12 half-farms. It was a village inhabited largely by Gottschee Germans. A school was established in the village in 1843. In 1941, at the start of the Second World War, its ethnic German population was evicted. The Stara Cerkev volunteer fire department became a founding unit of the Kočevje municipal fire department on 28 August 1955.

== Church ==
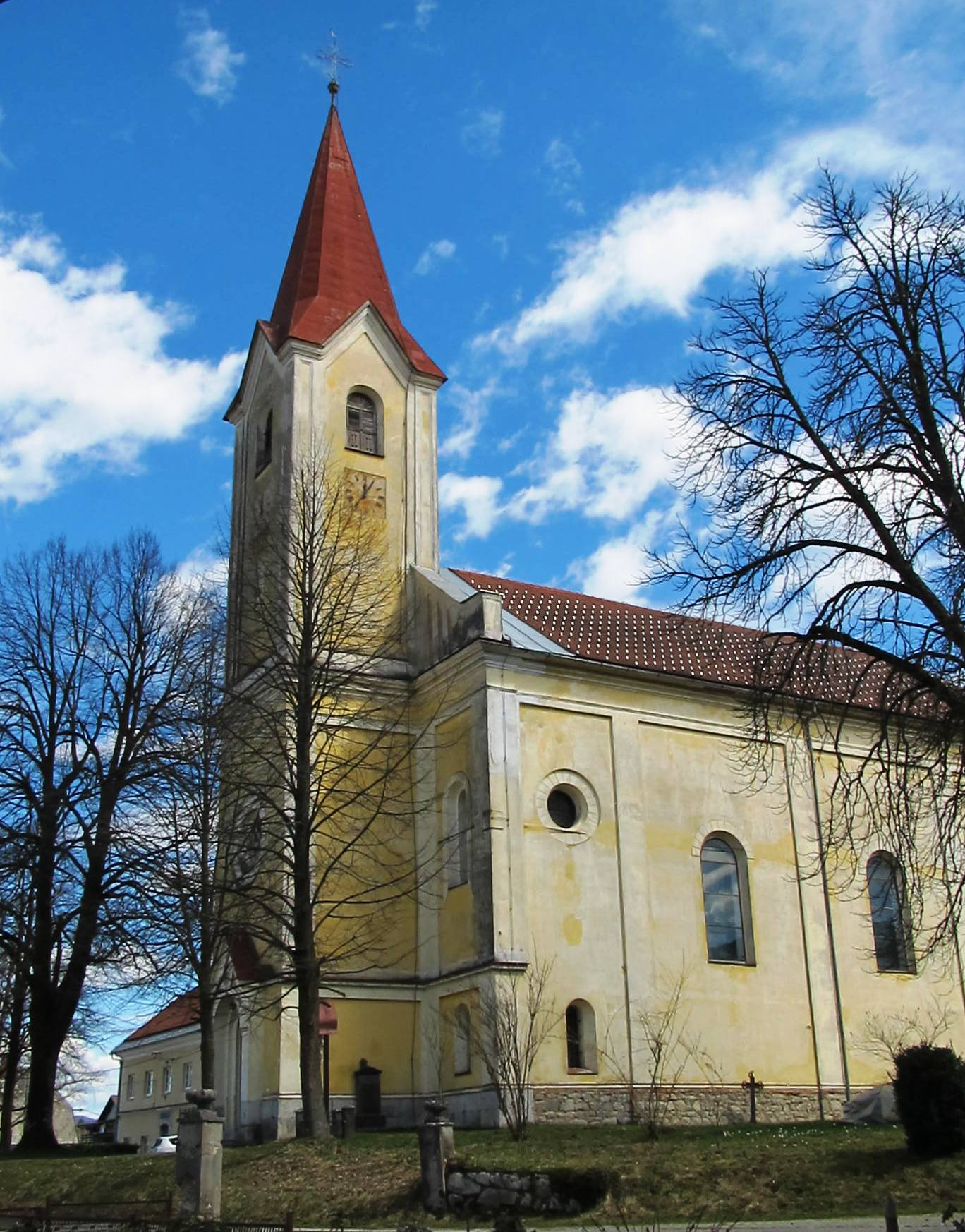
Northwest view

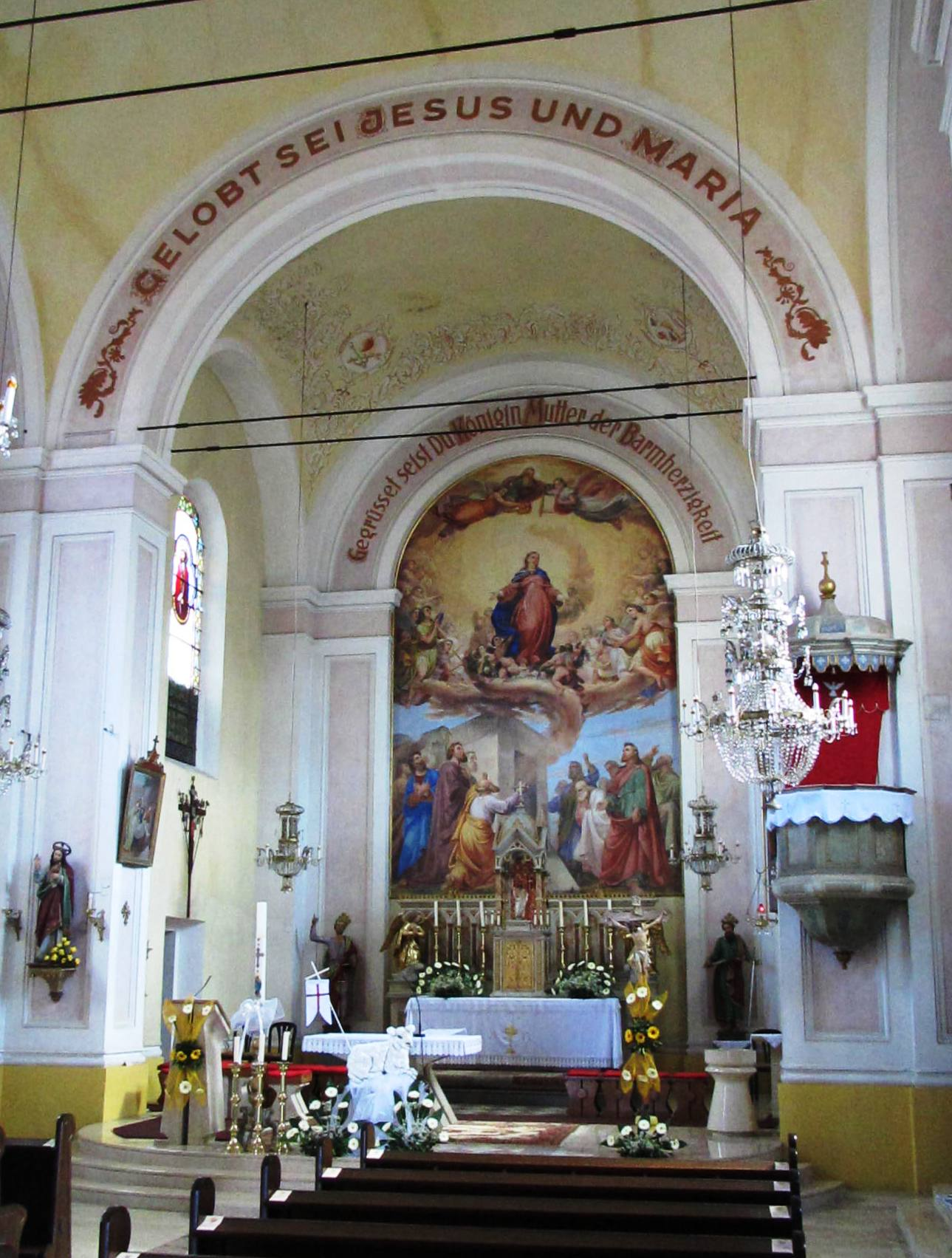
Arch and chancel

Assumption Church

The local parish church is dedicated to the Assumption of Mary and belongs to the Roman Catholic Diocese of Novo Mesto. It was built between 1853 and 1855 by the Friulian master builder Silvester Venchiarutti on the site of an earlier church. The sole fresco in the church, located above the main altar, depicts the Assumption of Mary. It is work by the Italian painter Domenico Fabris. The first church at the site was built before 1339 and stood until 1820. A second church stood at the site until 1853. Stara Cerkev was elevated to a parish in 1788. Stara Cerkev was a chapelry to the parishes of Ribnica and later Kočevje before it was elevated to a parish. The bell tower of the current church contains a bell from the 15th century, which is also the oldest bell in the Kočevje region. The rear wall of the chancel features a painting of the Assumption by Domenico Fabris (1814–1901) from Osoppo. The church also has two paintings by Henrika Langus (1836–1876).

== Cemetery ==
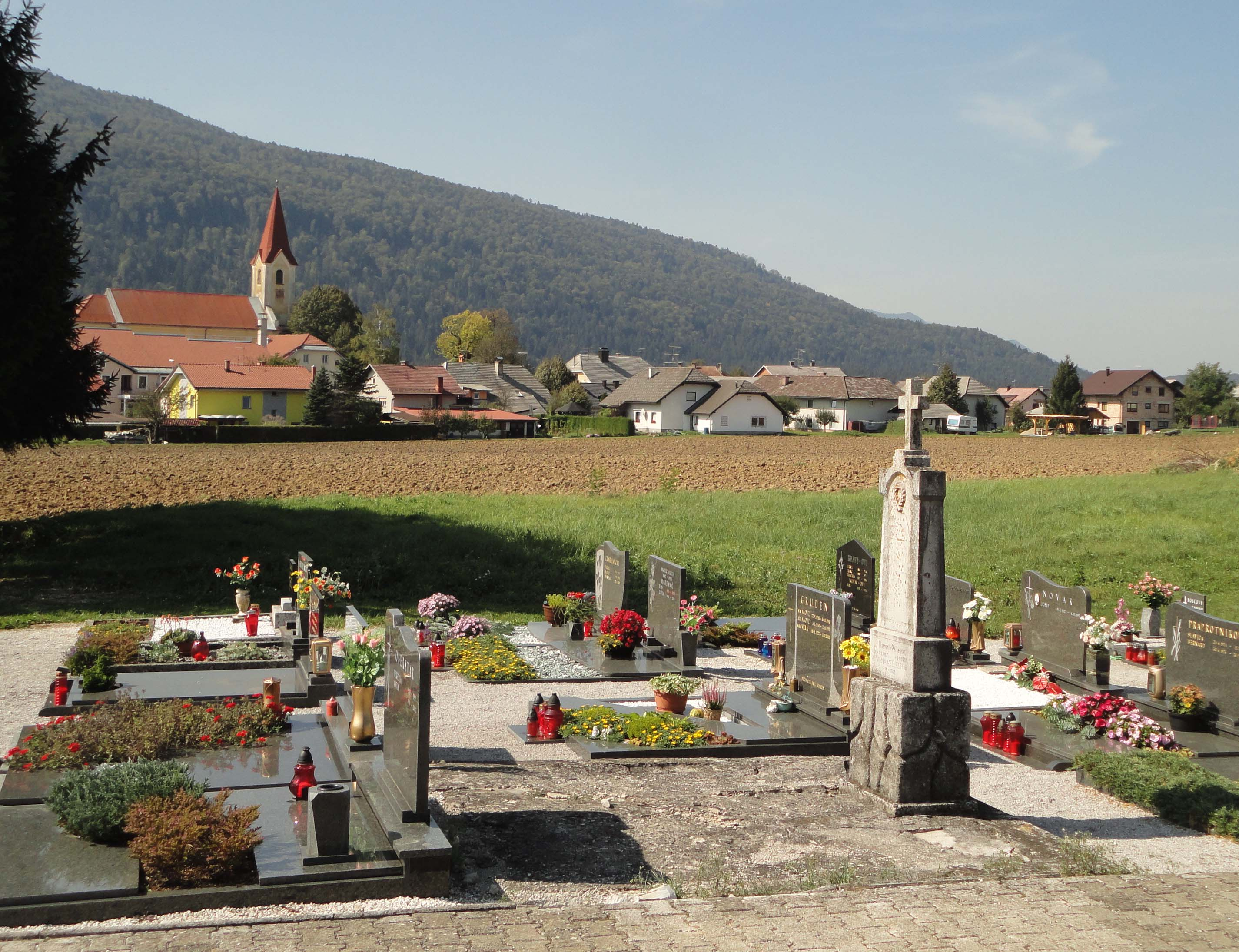
Cemetery

The parish cemetery lies west of the settlement.

== Notable people ==
Notable people that were born or lived in Stara Cerkev include:

- Ferdinand Erker (1866–1939), deacon in Kočevje and honorary canon in Ljubljana
- Jožef Erker (1851–1924), prebendary and canon in Ljubljana, religious writer, founder of the Kočevje orphanage
- Jožef Erker (1873–1939), parish priest and folk writer
- Jože Šeško (1908–1942), Partisan and People's Hero of Yugoslavia
