= Jón Jónsson Aðils =

Icelandic historian (1869–1920)

Jón Jónsson Aðils (25 April 1869, Reykjavík - 5 July 1920) was an Icelandic historian. He has been described as "Iceland's most prolific historian of the early twentieth century." Historians and political scientists argue that Aðils strongly shaped Icelandic nationalist discourse, and that his influence still affects Icelandic discourse on sovereignty issues, such as European integration.

== Historiography ==
He is known for distinguishing periods in Icelandic history into golden ages, periods of decline and periods of humiliation. In Aðils's narrative, the golden age begins with settlement in 874 (and reaches its high point during the Saga Age) and ends when Iceland falls under foreign rule (Jónsson 1903, 79, 88–89, 103, 105, 178). Under foreign rule, the Icelandic nation declined and ultimately suffered humiliation (Jónsson 1903, 241–242). Aðils' lessons were that under Icelandic rule, the nation was prosperous, productive and artistic, but suffered under foreign rule. However, Aðils argued that within every Icelander, a desire for freedom and nationalism remained, and only had to be awoken. Historian Guðmundur Hálfdanarson suggests that Aðils himself was doing his best to awaken this slumbering nationalist sentiment and strengthen the Icelandic pursuit of independence.
