= Jantz =

Jantz is a surname. Notable people with the surname include:

- Barry Jantz (born 1959), American businessman and politician
- Forgiato Blow (born Kurt Jantz, 1985), American rapper
- Richard Jantz, American anthropologist

== See also ==
- Gantz (disambiguation)
- Jantzen (disambiguation)
