= Georg Jonke =

- Born: April 17, 1777; Konca Vas, Slovenia
- Died: April 12, 1864 (aged 86); Črmošnjice, Slovenia
- Occupations: Priest, beekeeper

Georg Jonke (Slovenized as Jurij Jonke; April 17, 1777 – May 12, 1864) was a Carniolan Roman Catholic priest and beekeeper.

== Life ==
Krajnski zhbelarzhik, the Slovene translation of Jonke's beekeeping guide

Jonke was born to an impoverished Gottschee German family in Konca Vas. He first attended school in Ljubljana and later in Graz, where he spent some time as a clerk in a legal office. After finishing school, he was ordained a priest on September 8, 1803, in Kočevje, and he then worked as a curate in Stara Loka and then became a vicar and catechist in Novo Mesto. In 1811, he was appointed the parish priest in Črmošnjice, and he performed this service until 1834, when he retired. After his retirement, he dedicated himself to beekeeping. He bought a large plot of land in Črmošnjice, where he established a large orchard and then bought hives for keeping bees. He maintained an average of 150 hives, and he also loaned out his bees to farmers in the vicinity.

Jonke later became a member of the Carniolan Agricultural Society, where he made proposals to improve beekeeping in Carniola. He published his proposals in the beekeeping journal Bienenzeitung and in the newspapers Lublanske novice and Illyrischer Blatt. In 1836, he published the beekeeping guide Anleitung zur praktischen Behandlung der Bienenzucht (Instructions for a Practical Approach to Beekeeping), which was translated that same year into Slovene as Krajnski zhbelarzhik (The Carniolan Beekeeper). The translation of the first edition was produced by Jožef Žemlja. He published a second edition in 1844, titled Theoretische und practische Anleitung zur Behandlung und Pflege der Bienen (Theoretical and Practical Instructions for the Handling and Care of Bees), which was translated into Slovene by Lovro Pintar. This was the third work (after the first two by Anton Janša) available to Slovene beekeepers. In his later years, Jonke turned his property over to his relatives to be managed until his death. This was unsuccessful, and Jonke lived his final years in poverty. He died in Črmošnjice.
