= Stöðulög =

Laws passed by Denmark in 1871, determining the standing of Iceland

Stöðulögin (The Laws of Standing, Danish: Landsstillingsloven or formally Lov af 2. januar 1871 om Islands forfatningsmæssige stilling i riget, Law of 2 January 1871 on the constitutional standing of Iceland within the realm) were laws passed by Denmark in 1871, determining the standing of Iceland in relation to the Danish state. The laws were followed by the granting of Iceland's first constitution in 1874.

Some time had passed since the abolition of absolute monarchy of the Danish king in 1848, and the Danish parliament had acquired legislative powers, while the Icelandic Althing was only a consultative assembly. The status of the Constitution of Denmark in Iceland was disputed: while the Danish government and legal experts claimed that the constitution did include Iceland, even though it had only to a limited degree become effective there, Icelandic politicians and Jón Sigurðsson in particular stated that the constitution was not valid in Iceland as it had never been formally made public there and as the royal promise that Iceland would be consulted on the constitution had not been fulfilled. The Danish trade monopoly had been abolished in 1855, and the Icelanders' struggle for independence, led by Jón Sigurðsson and his supporters, found little backing in Copenhagen.

The proposed Icelandic constitution was accepted by the Althing with some changes, but their amendments were turned down by the Danish parliament in 1867. The Danes passed the Stöðulög, which declared Iceland to be an inseparable part of Denmark. As compensation for this, the Danish state was to pay the Icelanders 50 thousand rigsdaler for the next ten years, decreasing to 30 thousand the following 20 years. The Icelanders were not happy with these laws, and the Althing voted against them 10 votes to 14 but accepted the financial subsidy. According to the bill, the new office of "Land-Chief of Iceland" was introduced. This official was to run the country according to orders from Denmark. The first to occupy this office was Hilmar Finsen, who began his duties on 1 April 1873.
