= Jakob Thorarensen =

Icelandic writer and poet

Jakob Thorarensen (18 May 1886 –1972) was an Icelandic writer and poet. His works centered around the lives of the working class Icelanders, and on the history of Iceland. Known predominantly for his works of poetry, one of Thorarensen's short stories, Last Words, received acclaim in his native Iceland.
