= Johan =

Johan may refer to:

- Johan (given name)
- Johan (1921 film), a Swedish film directed by Mauritz Stiller
- Johan (2005 film), a Dutch romantic comedy film
- Johan (band), a Dutch pop-group
  - Johan (album), a 1996 album by the group
- Johan Peninsula, Ellesmere Island, Nunavut, Canada
- Jo-Han, a manufacturer of plastic scale model kits
- Johan, the official mascot of the 1989 SEA Games in Kuala Lumpur

== See also ==
- John (name)
