= Jóhann Gunnar Sigurðsson =

Icelandic poet (1882–1906)

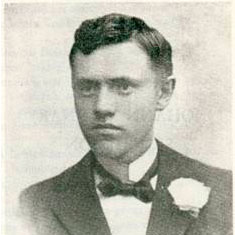
- Jóhann Gunnar Sigurðsson.
- Born: Jóhann Gunnar Sigurðsson; 2 February 1882; Reykjavík, Iceland
- Died: 20 May 1906 (aged 24); Reykjavík, Iceland
- Education: Menntaskólinn í Reykjavík
- Occupations: Poet, writer
- Writing career
- Language: Icelandic
- Period: 1903–1906
- Genre: New Romantic

Jóhann Gunnar Sigurðsson (2 February 1882 – 20 May 1906) was an Icelandic poet. A new New Romantic-style writer, Jóhann studied at the Menntaskólinn í Reykjavík until 1903. In November 1905, Jóhann fell ill and was hospitalized. He died on 20 May 1906, aged 24, in Reykjavík.
