= Þórður Jónassen =

Icelandic politician (1800–1880)

Þórður Jónassen (26 February 1800 – 25 August 1880) was an Icelandic civil servant who served as Governor of Iceland (1860–1865).

He served on the Reykjavík City Council (1847–1850) and (1851–1856).
