= Hilmar Finsen =

Danish-Icelandic politician (1824–1886)

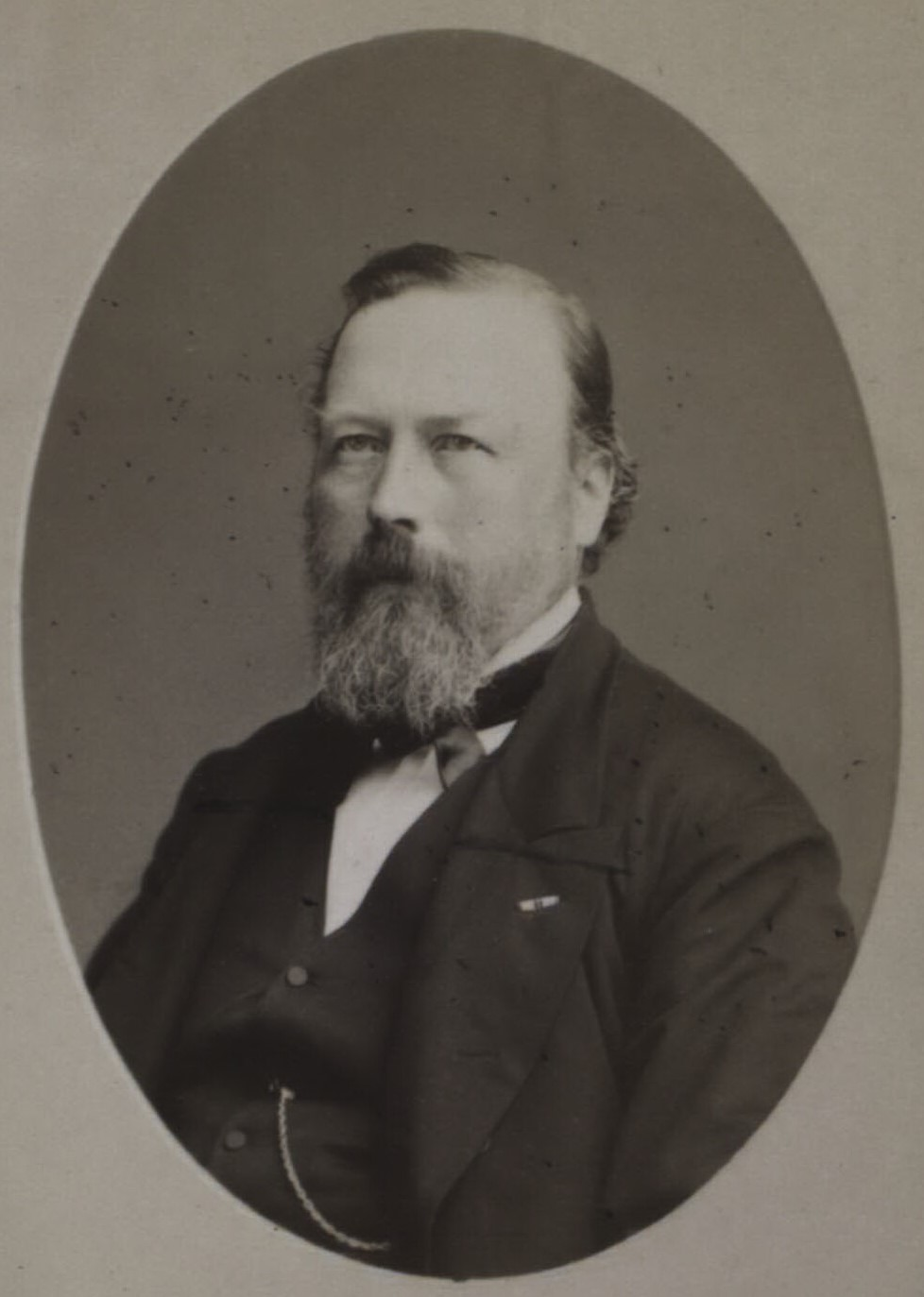
Søren Hilmar Steindór Finsen

Søren Hilmar Steindór Finsen (24 January 1824 – 15 January 1886), commonly known as Hilmar Finsen in Iceland, was a Danish–Icelandic politician who served as Governor of Iceland (1865–1872).

In 1871, the Stöðulög bill was introduced, in which the new office of "Land-Chief of Iceland" replaced the governor. This official was to run the country according to orders from Denmark. Finsen, being the most recent Governor was chosen to hold the position, beginning his duties on 1 April 1873.
