= Thoroddsen =

Thoroddsen is a common Icelandic family name. It may refer to:

- Ásdís Thoroddsen (born 1959), Icelandic actress and film director
- Björn Thoroddsen (born 1958), Icelandic musician, guitar player
- Emil Thoroddsen (1898–1944), Icelandic composer, playwright and critic
- Gunnar Thoroddsen (1910–1983), Icelandic politician, Prime Minister of Iceland from 1980 to 1983
- Halldóra K. Thoroddsen (1950–2020), Icelandic writer
- Jón Thoroddsen elder (c. 1818–1868), Icelandic author
- Jón Thoroddsen junior (1898–1924), Icelandic author.
- Skúli Thoroddsen (1859–1916), Icelandic politician and judge
- Sigurður S. Thoroddsen (1902–1983), Icelandic politician
- Þorvaldur Thoroddsen (1855–1921), Icelandic geologist and geographer
- Theodóra Thoroddsen (1863–1954), Icelandic poet
