= Kópavogsbærinn (building) =

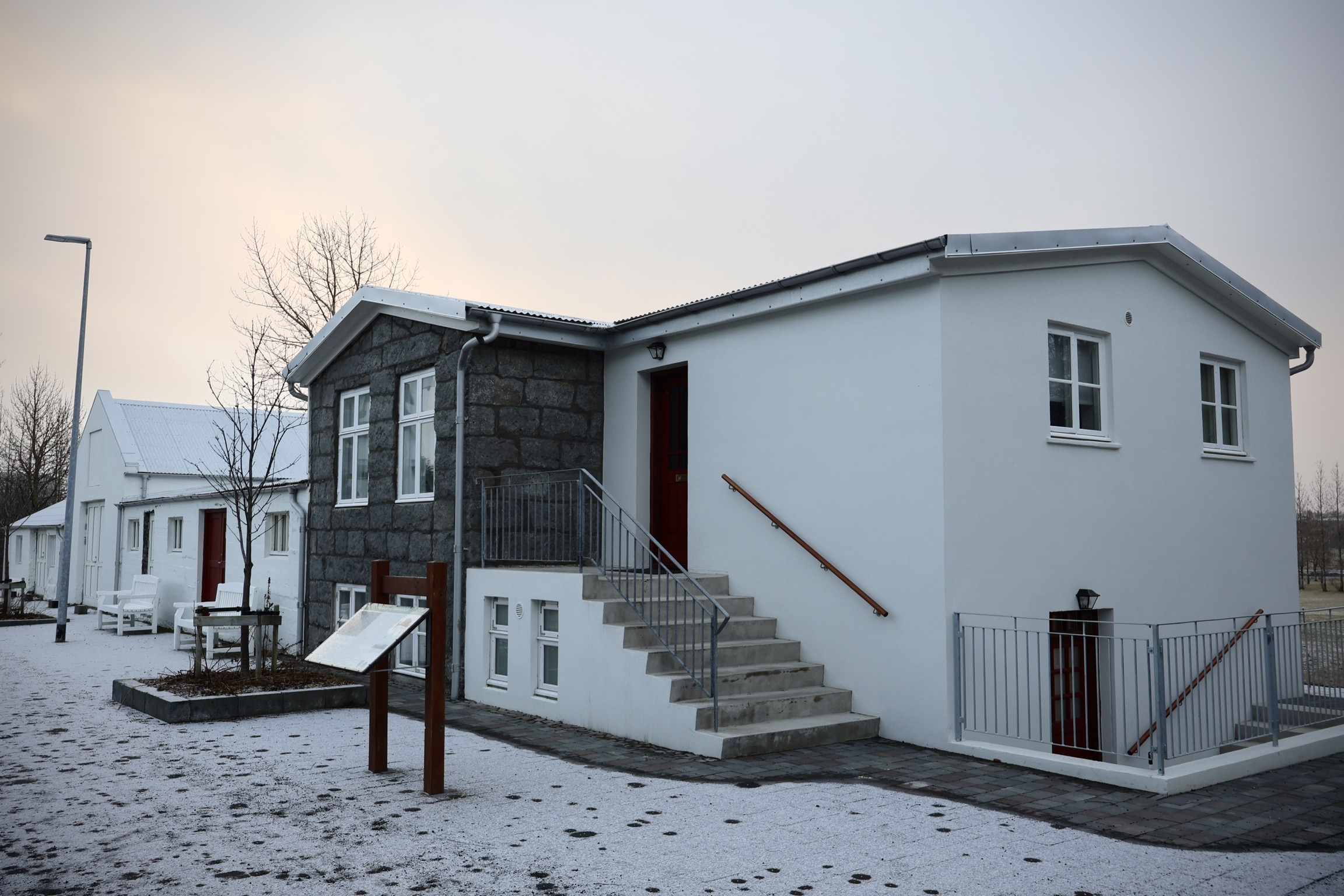
- Kópavogsbærinn, January 2025.

General information
- Location: Kópavogstún 14, Kópavogur, Iceland
- Completed: 1904

Design and construction
- Architect: Erlendur Zakaríasson

Kópavogsbærinn (Note: Not to be confused with the town of Kópavogur, which bears the official name Kópavogsbær. Alternatively known as Gamli Kópavogsbærinn (lit. 'The old Kópavogur farm/town'), or Kópavogsbúið.) (lit. 'Kópavogur farm') is a historic residential building in Kópavogur, Iceland. It is one of only two protected buildings in the town, being situated in the Kársnes district by Kópavogstún, and is the oldest preserved building in the town.

Furthermore, the building is one of the few surviving Icelandic stone buildings situated outside the capital—Reykjavík.

== History ==
The building was raised between 1902 and 1904 by Erlendur Zakaríasson, who resided there alongside his spouse Ingveldur Guðmundsdóttir. Erlendur, a stonemason by trait, constructed his home using hewn basalt and stone mortar, drawing on experience he had learned while working on the construction of the Alþingishúsið from 1880 to 1881. Already by this time, the neighbouring structures of the old Kópavogsbær, located south of Erlendur's residence, had fallen into disrepair. The spouses made a living raising horses, sheep and cattle, selling milk in Reykjavík. Their pasture extented east of the Hvammkotslækur River into Fífuhvammur and Fossvogur.

In 1924 the Women's Association Hringurinn was granted Kópavogur land to run a recreational facility for tuberculosis patients. The association decided to run a farm alongside their facility, purchasing the building when it became available. The farm operated until 1948 and expanded Erlendur's stone structure, featuring a barn, storage building, chicken coop, and a cowshed.

By 1948 the farm had been acquired by the State Treasury and State Hospital of Iceland, which continued agriculture on the land until the 1960s. The last residents of the farmhouse were farm manager Bjarni Pétursson Walen and Svanborg Sæmundsdóttir, residing there until 1983.

In 2012, Katrín Jakobsdóttir, the Minister of Education and Culture, approved a proposal to establish protection over the historic site, with it becoming the first protected building in Kópavogur. In 2020, at the initiative of the local municipality, an informative sign was set up by the old Kópavogsbærinn. It contains information about the settlement, as well as information regarding the history of Kópavogur land.

In June 2021, an agreement was signed, under which the Lions Club of Kópavogur would renovate the building with the goal of creating two apartments on-site, which could be rented out at affordable rates. The Town Council of Kópavogur pledged 25 million krones to support the project. During renovations, the building's stone façade was restored.
