= Garðabær =

- Municipality
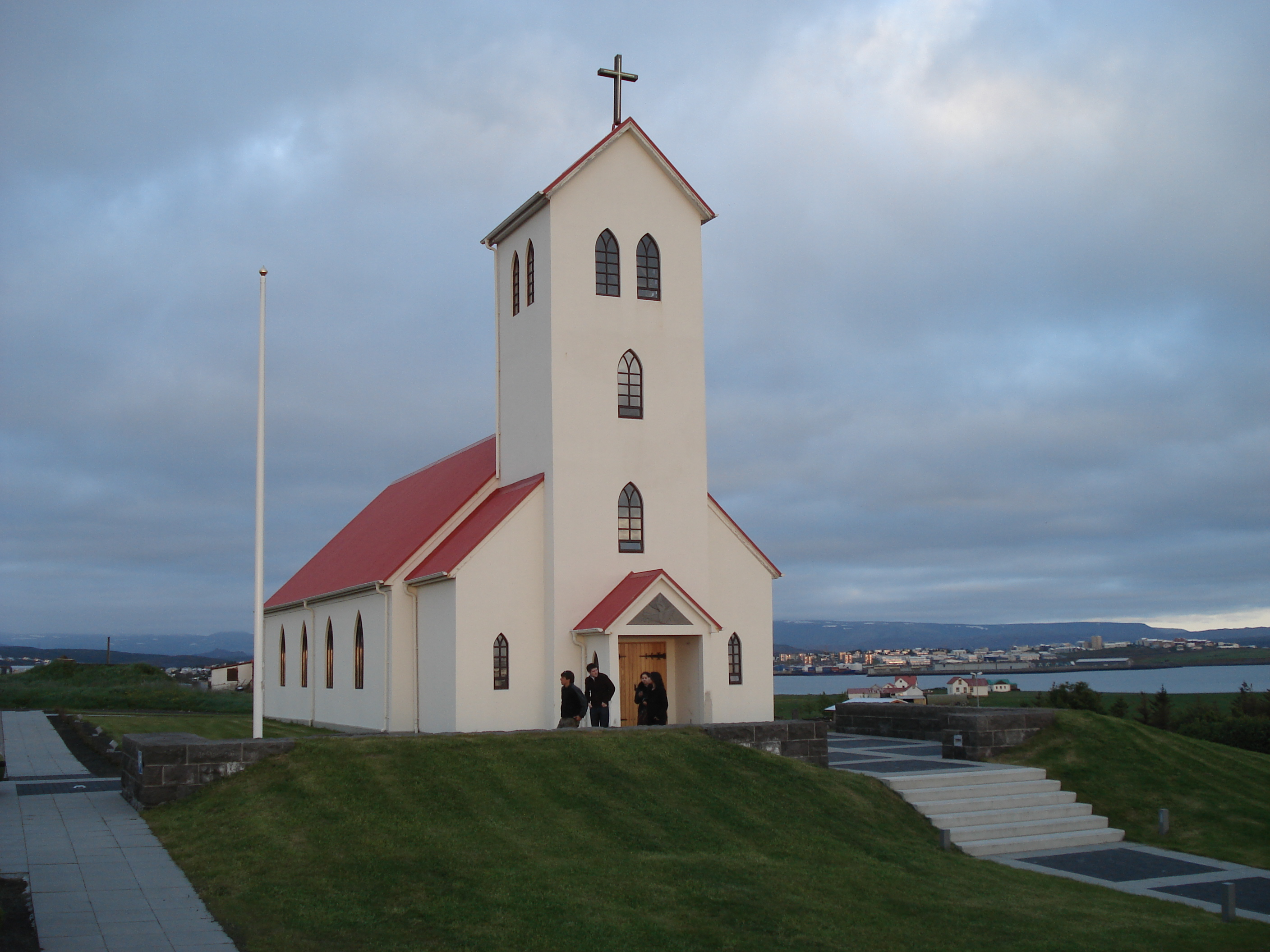
- Garðakirkja in Garðabær, Iceland

- Location of Garðabær

- Location within Iceland
- Country: Iceland
- Region: Capital Region
- Constituency: Southwest Constituency
- Established: 1878
- Market right: 1 January 1976

Government
  - Mayor: Almar Guðmundsson (IP)

Area
  - Total: 46 km^{2} (18 sq mi)

Population (2025)
  - Total: 20,116
  - Density: 440/km^{2} (1,100/sq mi)
- Postal code(s): 210–225
- Municipal number: 1300
- Website: gardabaer.is

Garðabær (Icelandic pronunciation: [ˈkarðaˌpaiːr̥]) is a town and municipality in the Capital Region of Iceland.

== History ==
Garðabær is a growing town in the Capital Region. It is the fifth largest municipality in Iceland with a population of 20,116 (1 January 2025).

The site of Garðabær has been inhabited since Iceland was first settled in the 9th century. Landnámabók, the Book of Settlement, tells of two farms on the site of Garðabær: Vífilsstaðir and Skúlastaðir. The former was named after Vífill, who was a slave of Ingólfur Arnarson, the first settler of Iceland. Ingólfur gave Vífill his freedom and he made his home at Vífilsstaðir.

== Facilities ==
The only IKEA store in Iceland is located in Garðabær, as is the only Costco store. The town is also home to Marel hf., the largest company on NASDAQ OMX Iceland by market capitalisation.

380 studios, the TV studio for the children's television programmes LazyTown and LazyTown Extra and the headquarters for LTS Garðbær Studios, is located in the town.

== Education ==
Among schools in the town are seven elementary schools including Sjálandsskóli.

Sjálandsskóli was established in 2005, and may be better known internationally for providing space in its building for the International School of Iceland.

== Sports ==
The town's main sports club is Stjarnan, best known for its men's football team that plays in the Icelandic Premier League and won the competition for the first time in 2014. The club's women's football section has been even more successful; it is the currently reigning champion of the Icelandic Women's Premier League and has won four of the last six titles. The Oddur Golf Club was established in 1990 and has hosted the Icelandic Golf Championship in 2006 and the European Ladies' Amateur Team Championship in 2016. Award-winning dancer Hanna Rún Óladóttir and strength athlete Páll Logason live in Garðabær.

== Notable people ==
- Kolbeinn Kristinsson (born 1988), Icelandic professional boxer

== Music ==
Musicians from Garðabær include members of Of Monsters and Men, Mínus, Dikta and Ourlives. Brothers Ómar and Óskar Guðjónsson of ADHD, as well as Ragnheiður Gröndal, all hail from the town. Guitarist Björn Thoroddsen was named Garðabær Artist of 2002.

== Surroundings ==
There are many nature reserves surrounding Garðabær, and the view from various sites in Garðabær is spectacular. From many areas in Garðabær the impressive Snæfellsjökull (Snæfells Glacier) can be seen to the north-west, as well as Mt. Esja, and there is also a good view over the capital Reykjavík and the neighbouring town of Kópavogur. The view to the south includes the mountains of the Reykjanes Peninsula.

== Bessastaðahreppur ==
Bessastaðahreppur was a municipality that became part of Garðabær in 2012.

=== International Cities of Friendship ===
Bessastaðahreppur's Cities of Friendship as of January 1, 2007:

- Gjøvik - Norway
- Gävle - Sweden
- Rauma - Finland
- Næstved - Denmark

=== Nature ===
The Bessastaðahreppur (or Álftanes) area is primarily a residential area. There are fine mountain views. Many rare shore birds breed here along the beaches.

==== The Bessastaðir manor farm ====
The official residence of the president of Iceland, built in 1766, heavily renovated over the years.

== Twin towns – sister cities ==
Garðabær is twinned with:

- Asker, Norway
- Eslöv, Sweden
- Jakobstad, Finland
- Rudersdal, Denmark

== Transport links ==
Garðabær is connected to the bus network of Strætó. Also the Borgarlína network, a BRT-system connecting Reykjavik and surrounding area, is under construction.
