= Theodóra Thoroddsen =

Icelandic poet

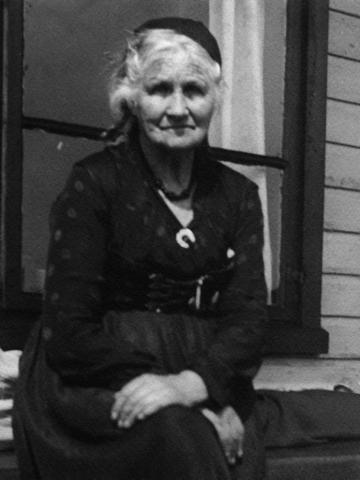
Theodóra Thoroddsen

Theodóra Friðrika Guðmundsdóttir Thoroddsen (1 July 1863 – 23 February 1954) was an Icelandic poet, folktale collector, translator, and sewing and textile artist.

== Life ==
Theodóra was born at Kvennabrekka in the Dalasýslur region of Iceland. Her mother was Katrín Ólafsdóttir and her father was priest and parliamentarian Guðmundur Einarsson. She graduated from Reykjavik Women's Gymnasium in 1879. In 1884, she married Skúli Thoroddsen, who later became a prominent member of parliament, and together they had 13 children. They lived in Ísafjörður in the West fjords region of Iceland, where Skúli served as sýslumaðr, before moving to Bessastaðir in 1899 and to Reykjavík in 1908.

== Career ==
Theodóra was an active participant in Reykjavík's cultural, literary, and political scenes. She was particularly involved in matters concerning women's rights and in promoting women's participation in cultural and literary life. She was a member of the Reykjavík Women's Reading Association and published her first works (poems, stories, and essays) in the association's handwritten periodical Mánaðarritið.

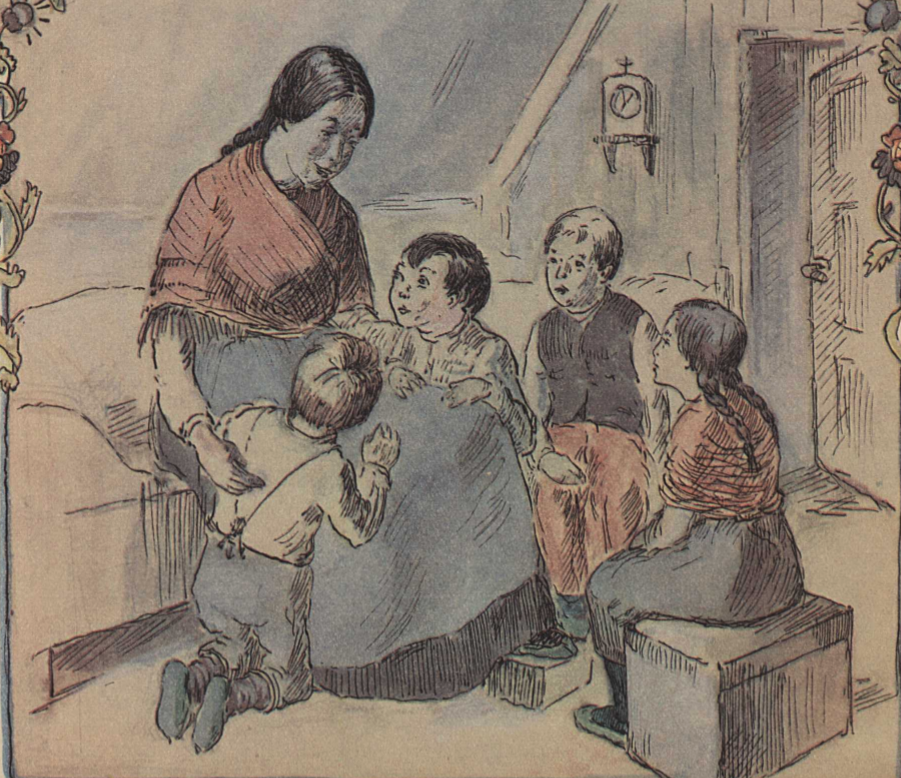
Guðmundur Thorsteinsson's (Muggur's) illustration for the cover of Theodóra's Þulur (1916)

As a poet, Theodóra is best known for her Þulur, a collection of verses some of which first appeared in the journal Skírnir in 1914 along with a short preface. They were later published in 1916 in an edition that included illustrations by her nephew Guðmundur Thorsteinsson (Muggur), and in another expanded edition in 1938, with illustrations by both Muggur and Sigurður S. Thoroddsen. The latter edition has been reprinted numerous times since. In her work, together with the work of fellow Icelandic poets Ólöf Sigurðardóttir and Unnur Benediktsdóttir Bjarklind, Theodóra helped to develop and popularize a new form of þulur derived from older traditions of "oral litany characterized by fantasy, rhapsodic structure, and fragments of nursery rhymes and other kinds of folk poetry." She published other kinds of poetry in numerous Icelandic periodicals and was also one of the first Icelandic poets to experiment with prose poetry.

In addition to her poetry, Theodóra's short story collection Eins og gengur was published in 1920. Her folktale collection, Islandsk folketru, was published in Oslo in 1924 as a part of Fredrik Paasche's Islandske Småskrifter series. Theodóra translated numerous stories and folktales from Norwegian and Faroese. She was also the subject of drawing by Swedish artist Siri Derkert, which is now a part of Moderna Museet's permanent collection in Stockholm.

== Family ==
Among Theodóra and Skúli's 13 children were poet Jón Thoroddsen, the namesake of Skúli's poet and novelist father, engineer and politician Sigurður S. Thoroddsen, and physician and politician Katrín Thoroddsen. Among their great-grandchildren is Katrín Jakobsdóttir, the former Prime Minister of Iceland.

== Legacy ==
Theodóra's collected works were edited by Sigurður Nordal and published in 1960, just six years after her death. Her Þulur was translated into English and published alongside the work of her son Jón in 2020. Her collection of letters are a part of the National Library's manuscript and private archives collection.

Theodóra, her husband Skúli, and several other of her family members feature in her great-grandson Ármann Jakobsson's historical novel Vonarstræti (2008). The title of the novel alludes to the house in Reykjavík at Vonarstræti 12 where Theodóra and Skúli lived, which remains an important literary landmark.

== Selected list of works ==
- Þulur (1916)
- Eins og gengur (1920)
- Islandsk folketru (1924)
- Ritsafn (1960), edited by Sigurður Norda
