= Grímur Thomsen =

Icelandic poet and editor

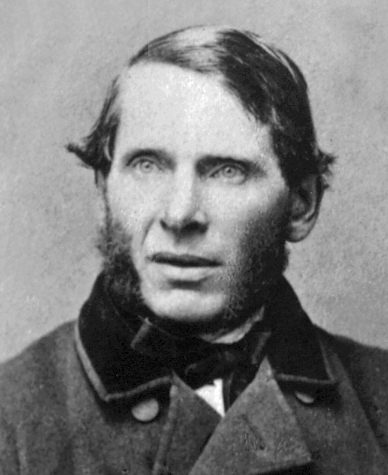
- Grímur Thomsen
- Born: 15 May 1820; Bessastaðir, Iceland, Kingdom of Denmark
- Died: 27 November 1896 (aged 76); Bessastöðum, Iceland, Kingdom of Denmark
- Education: PhD, University of Copenhagen, 1854
- Occupations: Poet, member of parliament, farmer
- Writing career
- Literary movement: Romanticism

Grímur Thomsen (15 May 1820 – 27 November 1896), Icelandic poet and editor, was born in Bessastaðir in 1820.

== Life and work ==
Grímur was the son of Þorgrímur Tómasson, a goldsmith. In 1837, he went to the University of Copenhagen, where he studied law and philology, but he also became interested in philosophy and aesthetics. He became an enthusiastic follower of the Pan-Scandinavian movement, although this was not generally favored by his countrymen.

At the University of Copenhagen, Thomsen wrote a dissertation on Byron and received a master's degree. Because of the quality of his written dissertation, he received a scholarship to travel around Europe for two years. Eventually he would be awarded a doctoral degree for his written dissertation on Byron. In 1848, Thomsen entered the Danish diplomatic service. In 1851, he returned to Copenhagen, where he was appointed chief of the ministry of foreign affairs. He retired in 1866 and returned to Iceland. In Iceland, he became a member of parliament (Alþing) and a farmer in Bessastaðir. Thomsen died in 1896.

Thomsen is considered one of Iceland's most important romantic era writers. In addition to being a poet (two separate collections, Reykjavik, 1880, and Copenhagen, 1895) he is also the author of numerous critical and historical essays in Icelandic and Danish. Thomsen was an admirer of Greek literature and translated a great number of poems from Greek into Icelandic.
