= Hanna Rún Óladóttir =

Icelandic ballroom and Latin dancer (born 1990)

- Born: 1990 July 17th Kópavogur, Iceland
- Citizenship: Icelandic
- Occupation: Ballroom dancer
- Years active: 1997–
- Children: 2

Hanna Rún Óladóttir (born 17 July 1990) is an Icelandic ballroom and Latin dancer. Born in Kópavogur, Iceland, in 1990, Hanna began dancing at the age of 4. During her competitive career she has won titles in Iceland and Europe. She has won the Icelandic Ballroom Championships more than 15 times, first in 1997.

In 2011, Hanna competed as a professional dancer on the Icelandic TV series Dans, dans, dans, with her then partner Sigurður Þór Sigurðsson. Her current dance partner is Nikita Bazev, with whom she won the 2013 WDSF International Open Latin in France.

Hanna represented Iceland in the Eurovision Young Dancers 2015 in the pre-qualifying round in Czech Republic.

== Personal life ==
Hanna was raised, with her parents and two sisters, in Garðabær, near the capital Reykjavík. Her father is a goldsmith.

She is married to Nikita Bazev, who's also a dancer and toghether they have a son and a daughter.
