= Dagur Sigurðarson =

Icelandic poet, translator and visual artist

Dagur Sigurðarson (6 August 1937 – 19 February 1994) was an Icelandic poet, translator and visual artist.

== Family ==
His maternal niece is Katrín Jakobsdóttir, the former Prime Minister of Iceland.

== Books ==
- Shares in the Sunset - 1958
- The Millennium Adventure - 1960
- The Dog Farm or the Reconstruction of the Economy - 1963
- Níðstaung hin meiri - 1965
- Some American Poems - 1966 (translations)
- Rough metal and gray silver - 1971
- Conscious widening of the buttocks - 1974
- The Queen of the Jungle Sacrifices Tarsan - 1974
- Fagurskinna - 1976
- Karlson and kerling hel - 1976
- Ordinary Housewife - 1977
- Sunshine Fool - 1980
- Before Laugavegur eruption - 1985
- Kella is not related to them - 1988
- Glímuskjálfti - 1989 (Total collection of poems of the day)
