= Bessastaðir =

Coordinates: 64°06′21″N 21°59′44″W

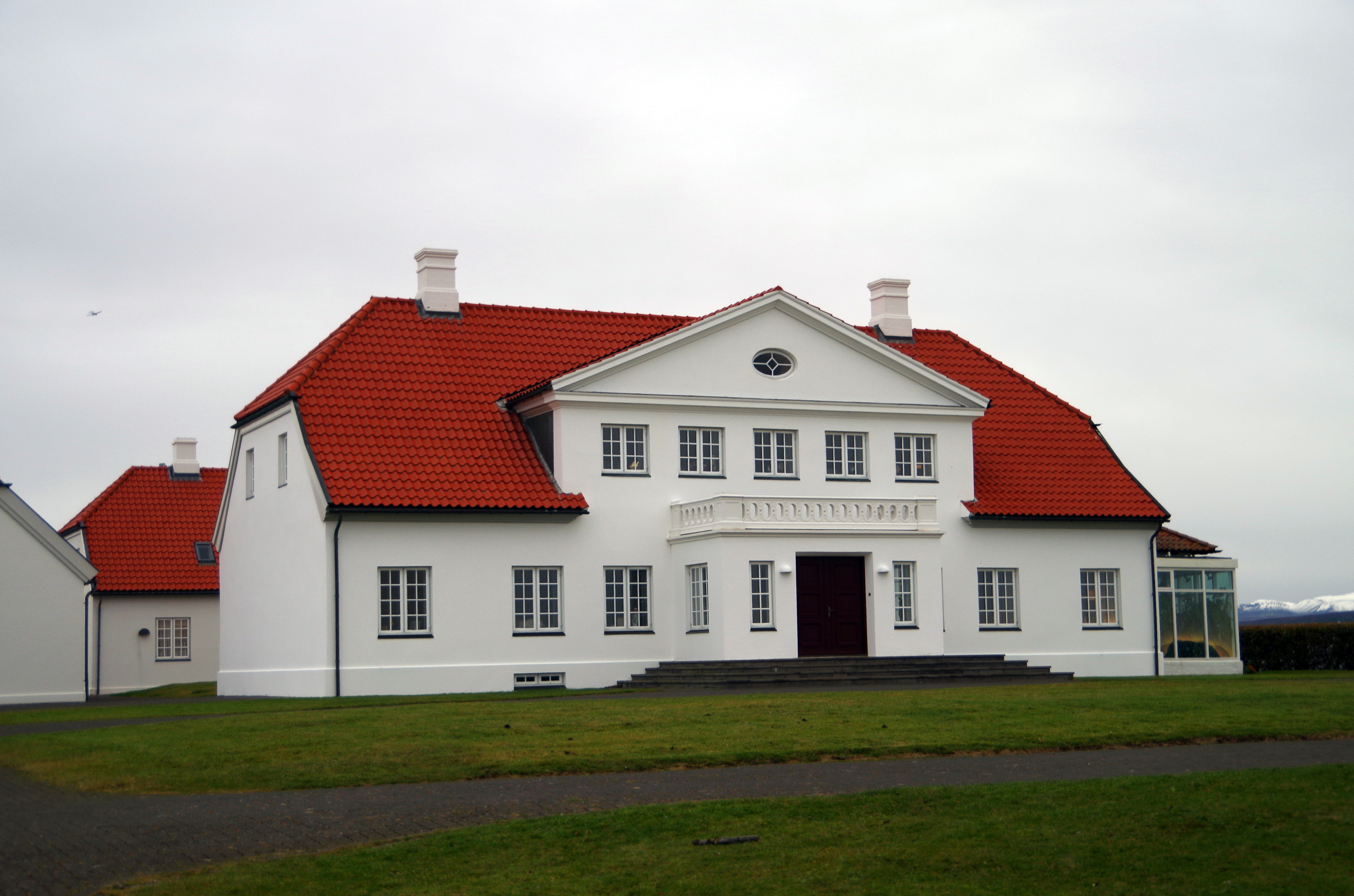
- Interactive map of the Bessastaðir area

General information
- Location: Álftanes, Iceland
- Current tenants: Halla Tómasdóttir

Bessastaðir (Icelandic pronunciation: [ˈpɛsːaˌstaːðɪr̥], lit. 'Bessi's Place') is the official residence of the president of Iceland. It is situated in Álftanes (Garðabær Municipality), about 15 kilometres (9.3 mi) from the capital city, Reykjavík.

== History ==
Bessastaðir was first settled in 1000. It became one of Snorri Sturluson's farms in the 13th century. After Snorri's murder in September 1241, Bessastaðir was claimed by the King of Norway. Thereafter it became a Royal stronghold and the dwellings of the King's highest-ranking officers and officials in Iceland. It resisted an attack by Turkish slave raiders in July 1627. In the late 18th century Bessastaðir was changed into a school for a few years, before becoming a farm. In 1867 the farm was purchased by the poet and statesman Grímur Thomsen, who lived there for almost two decades. Among later owners were editor and parliamentarian Skúli Thoroddsen, and his wife, Theodóra Thoroddsen, who was well known for her literary works. In 1940 Sigurður Jónasson bought Bessastaðir and donated it to the state in 1941 as a residence for the Regent and later the President of Iceland.

== Photo gallery ==
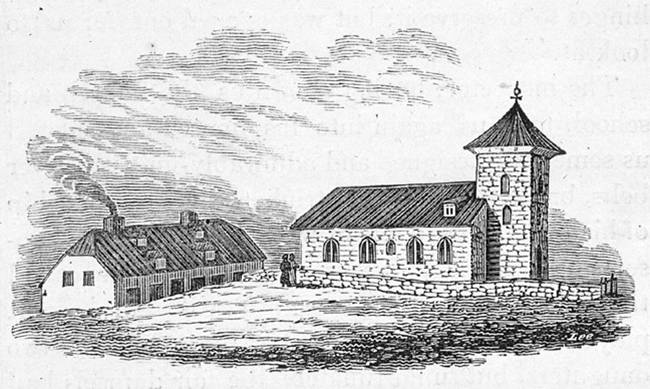

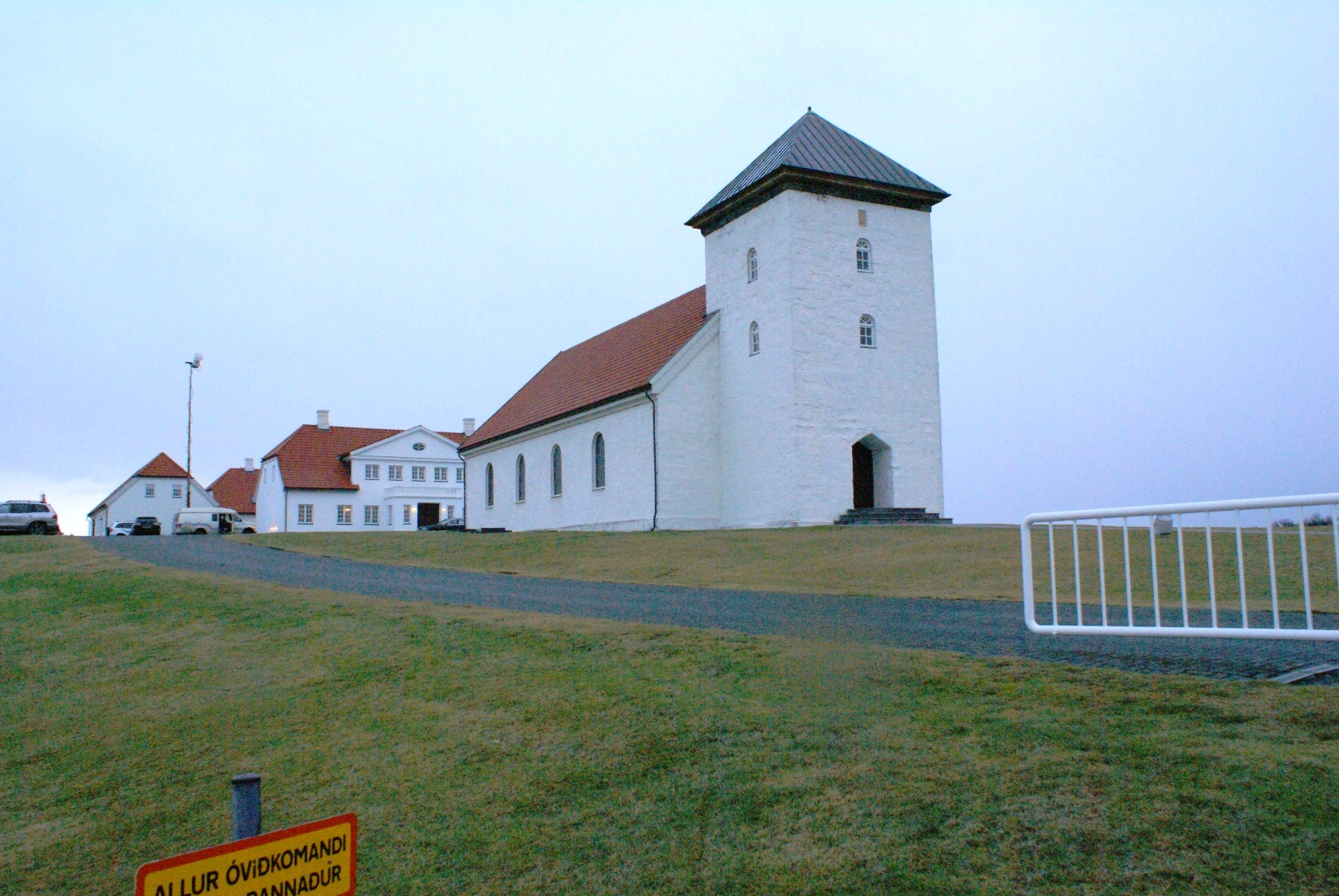
