= Jón Thoroddsen junior =

Icelandic writer

Jón Thoroddsen (18 February 1898 – 1 January 1925) was an Icelandic poet and playwright.

== Early life ==
Jón was born in Ísafjörður in the West Fjords region of Iceland. One of thirteen children, his parents were sýslumaður Skúli Thoroddsen and poet Theodóra Guðmundsdóttir Thoroddsen. Jón graduated from Reykjavík Junior College in 1918, studied at the University of Copenhagen in 1919, and completed the law exam at the University of Iceland in 1924.

== Career ==
In 1922, Jón published Flugur, a collection of short texts that scholars have since identified as the first collection of prose poetry in the Icelandic language. Prior to the publication of Flugur, prose poetry was rare in Icelandic literature. Thus, Jón's work was an important contribution to Icelandic modernism. The same year, he also published the three-act play María Magdalena and he published a number of other pieces in the Icelandic periodicals Eimreiðin, Iðunn, and Skírnir.

Outside of his literary activities, Jón was an active member of Iceland's Social Democratic Party. He was the party's candidate in the Norður-Ísafjarðarsýsla district in the 1923 parliamentary election but lost, receiving 30.67% of the vote.

== Death and legacy ==
Jón was hit by a tram in Copenhagen on 24 December 1924. He died a week later at the age of 26 on 1 January 1925. In 1933, Tómas Guðmundsson composed the elegy "Jón Thoroddsen. Cand. jur. In Memoriam," which is thought to be one of Iceland's greatest elegies.

Flugur was republished in 1986 and again in 2002 by Icelandic publisher JPV. The collection was also translated into English and published alongside the work of his mother Theodóra in 2020.
