= Álftanes =

- Town
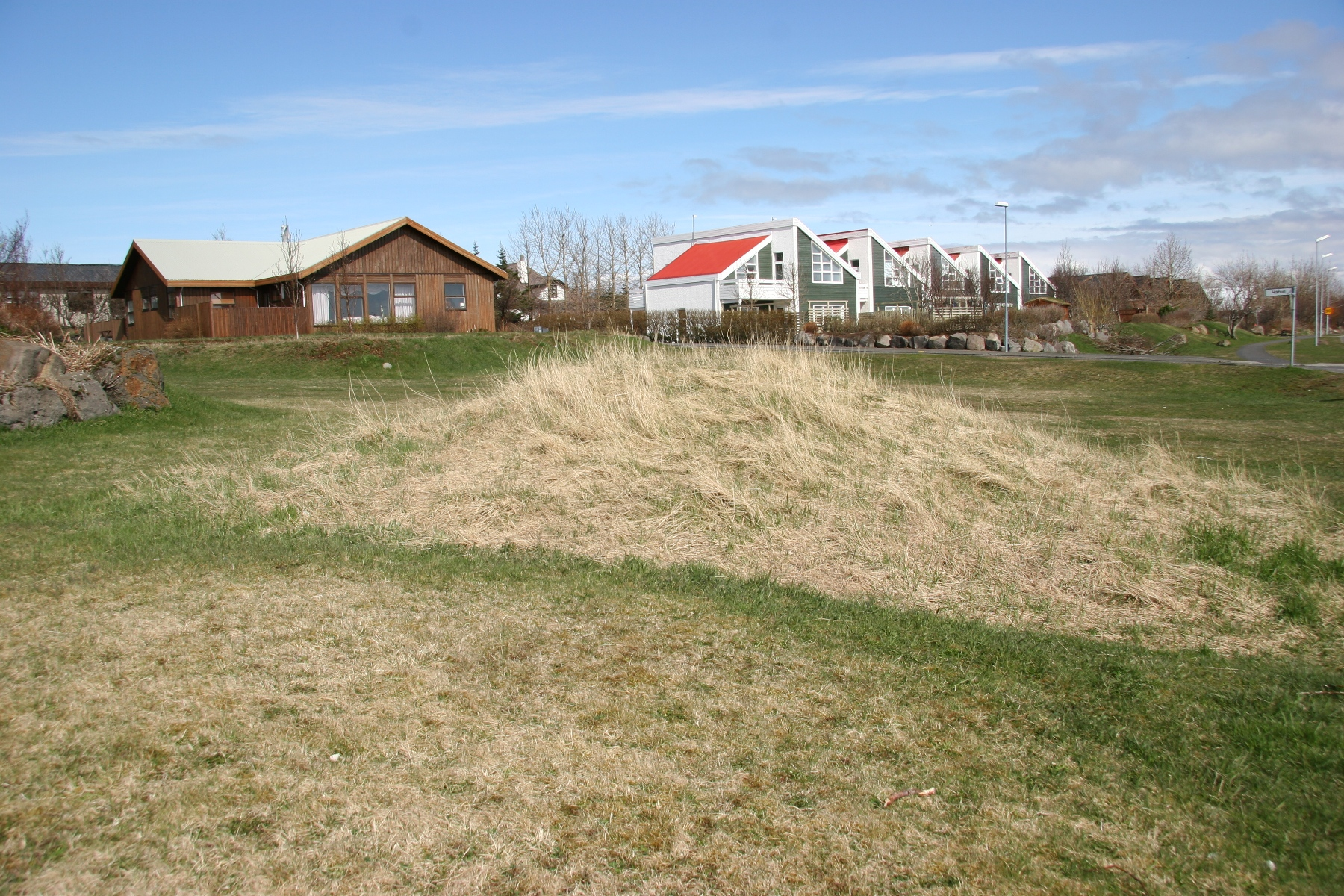

- Location within Iceland
- Coordinates: 64°06′23″N 22°1′0″W
- Country: Iceland
- Constituency: Southwest Constituency
- Region: Capital Region
- Municipality: Garðabær

Government
  - Mayor: Sigurður G. Gunnarsson

Area
  - Total: 5 km^{2} (1.9 sq mi)

Population (2011)
  - Total: 2,484
  - Density: 472/km^{2} (1,220/sq mi)
- Website: Official website
- Postal Codes: 225

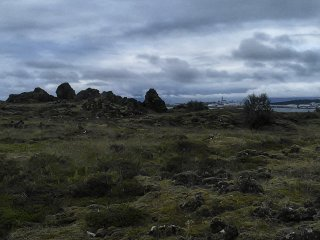
Galgahraun lava field on Álftanes

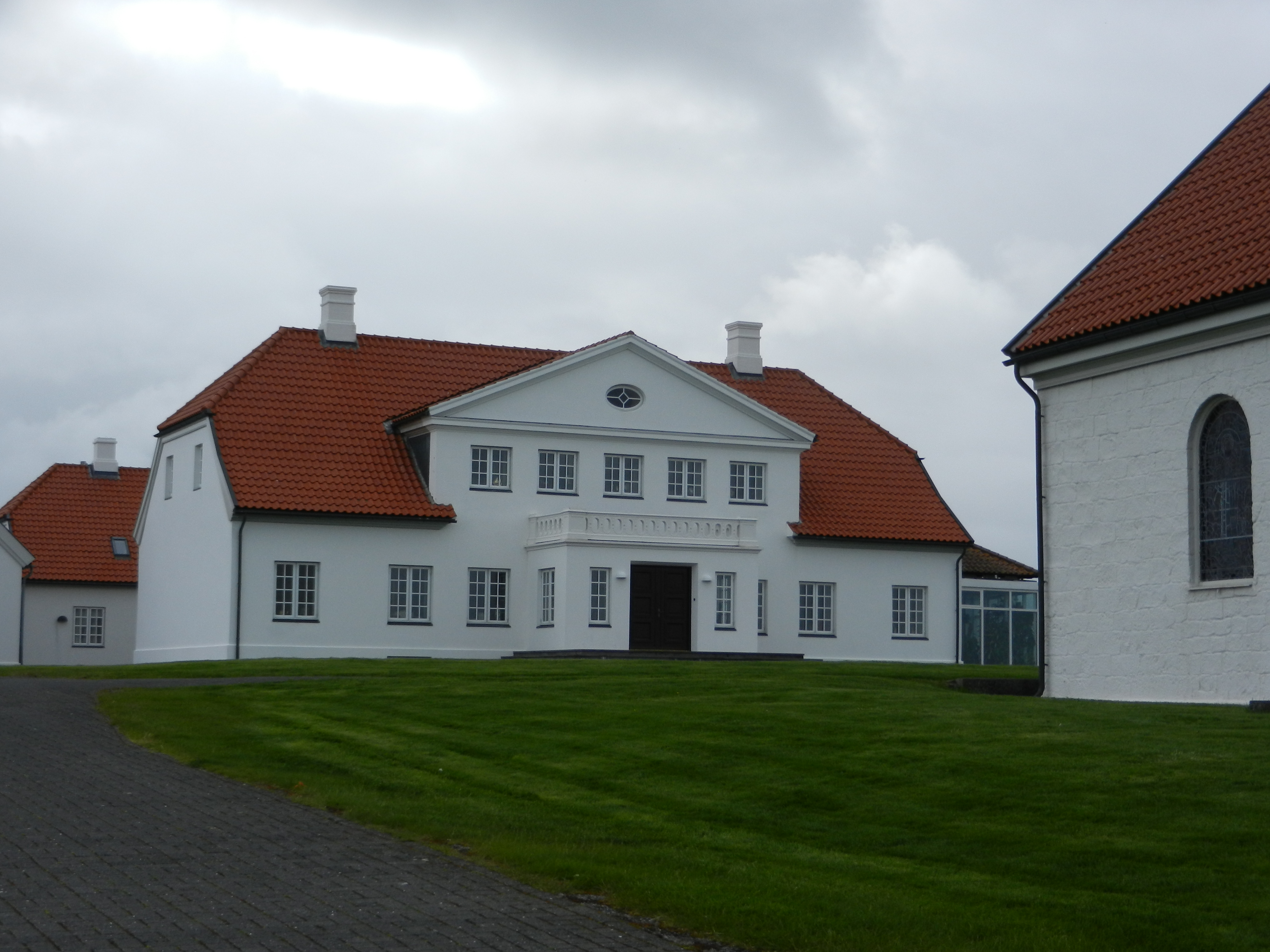
Bessastaðir

Álftanes (Icelandic pronunciation: [ˈaul̥taˌnɛːs]) is the name of a town and a collection of small peninsulas in Iceland. It means swan peninsula.

The best known of these peninsulas extrudes from the eastern part of Reykjanes with the town of the same name in the Capital Region of Iceland.

The municipality of Álftanes was merged into the neighboring municipality of Garðabær in January 2013. Álftanes had a population of 2,484 as of January 2011. The town contains the official residence of the President of Iceland, Bessastaðir.

== Sports ==
The town is home to the Ungmennafélag Álftaness multi-sport club.
