= Fífuhvammur =

- Kópavogur District
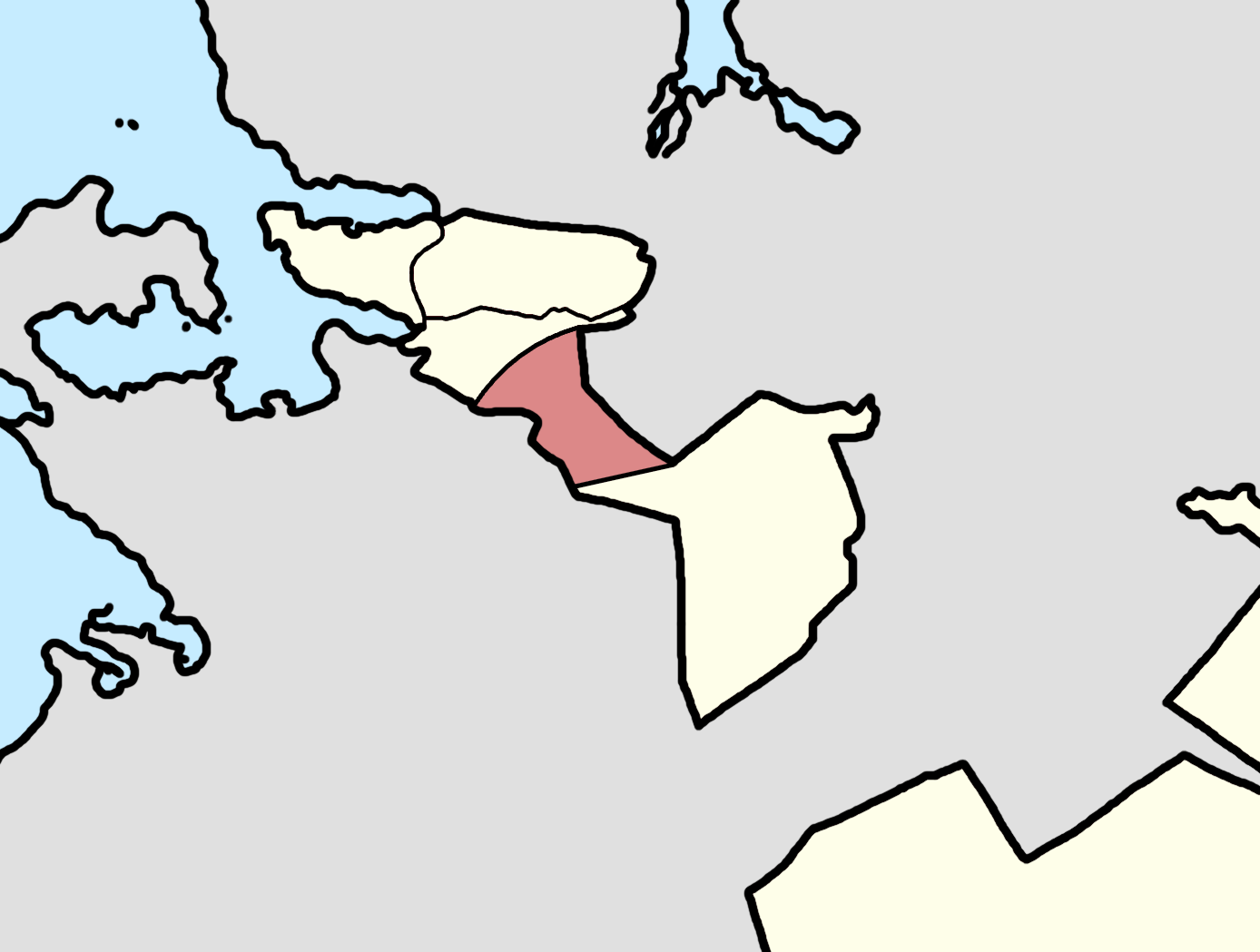
- Location of Fífuhvammur within Kópavogur
- Country: Iceland
- Constituency: Southwest
- Region: Capital Region
- Municipality: Kópavogur

Area
  - Total: 2.27 km^{2} (0.88 sq mi)

Population
  - Total: 2,540
  - Density: 11.2/km^{2} (29/sq mi)
- Postal code: 201

Fífuhvammur (Formerly also Hvammur, Hvammkot) is one of the five districts of the Icelandic town of Kópavogur. It encompasses the neighbourhoods of Lindir and Salir.

== History ==
The land is first recorded in a registry of land leases of the Viðey Monastery in 1312 under the name Hvammur. The land would remain in the possession of the monastery until the Protestant Reformation in Iceland in the mid 16th century.

The name Hvammkot first appears in an governor's account by Eggerts Hannesson in Bessastaðir from June 24, 1552. Formerly, Hvammkot was crown land, its land lease totalling 90 acres. The landbook of Árni Magnússon og Páll Vídalín from 23 October 1703, writes as follows about Hvammkot: "The worth of the land is uncertain. Its owner is the Royal Majesty. Its occupant is Teitur Jónsson, [who] lives on one half. Another, Marteinn Jónsson, lives on the other half."

On May 17, 1873, the land was sold off from royal possession for 594 rigsdaler. On January 1, 1891, resident Þorlákur Guðmundsson, a parliament representative of Árnessýsla, renamed the land Fífuhvammur.

The last occupants of the land were Ísak Bjarnason and Þórunn Kristjánsdóttir, who moved there in 1919, alongside their six children. Their land was eventually bought by the city of Kópavogur, and having fallen into disrepair, their residence was demolished in 1983.
