= Kolbeinn Kristinsson =

Icelandic boxer (born 1988)

Personal information
- Nickname: Ice Bear
- Born: 28 April 1988 (age 38) Reykjavík, Iceland
- Height: 6 ft 6 in (198 cm)
- Weight: Heavyweight

Boxing career
- Reach: N/A
- Stance: Orthodox

Boxing record
- Total fights: 20
- Wins: 20
- Win by KO: 14
- Losses: 0
- No contests: 0

Gunnar Kolbeinn Kristinsson (born 28 April 1988) is an Icelandic professional boxer. He is the current WBF and Baltic Boxing Union Heavyweight champion. He is #1 pound for pound in Iceland and ranked #68 Heavyweight in the world according to BoxRec.

== Professional career ==
Kolbeinn made his professional debut on November 8, 2014 against Janis Ginters. Kolbeinn won the fight via Unanimous Decision.

After accumulating a record of 11–0, Kolbeinn had his first fight in the United States. He faced Dell Long on January 17, 2020. Kolbeinn won the fight via a second-round knockout.

After a two year hiatus, Kolbeinn returned to the ring on October 8, 2022 against Santander Silgado. Kristinsson won the fight via a second-round knockout.

After accumulating a career record of 17–0, Kolbeinn fought for his first championship on May 31, 2025 against Mike Lehnis for the WBF and BBU Heavyweight championships. Kolbeinn won the fight via a seventh-round TKO, and thus won his first career championships.

He returned five months later on November 29 against Pedro Martinez. Kristinsson won the fight via a fifth-round knockout.

== Professional boxing record ==
20 fights	20 wins	0 losses
By knockout	14	0
By decision	6	0

No.	Result	Record	Opponent	Type	Round, time	Date	Location	Notes
20	Win	20–0	(Czech Republic) Pavel Sour	TKO	5 (10), 0:51	30 May 2026	Frederiksberghallen, Copenhagen, Denmark	
19	Win	19–0	(Venezuela) Pedro Martinez	KO	2 (8), 1:34	29 Nov 2025	Oulun Kamppailuklubi, Oulu, Finland	
18	Win	18–0	(Germany) Mike Lehnis	TKO	7 (12), 0:07	31 May 2025	Clubhalle 1. FCN, Nuremberg, Germany	Won vacant WBF and BBU heavyweight titles
17	Win	17–0	(Poland) Piotr Ćwik	RTD	1 (8), 3:00	7 Dec 2024	Sofiensaal, Vienna, Austria	
16	Win	16–0	(Finland) Mika Mielonen	RTD	5 (8), 3:00	3 Sep 2024	Töölö Sports Hall, Helsinki, Finland	
15	Win	15–0	(Ukraine) Pavlo Krolenko	RTD	5 (8), 3:00	1 Jun 2024	Liikuntahalli, Järvenpää, Finland	
14	Win	14–0	(England) Michael Bassett	TKO	2 (6), 2:02	30 Sep 2023	Sofiensaal, Vienna, Austria	
13	Win	13–0	(Colombia) Santander Silgado	KO	2 (4), 1:45	8 Oct 2022	(United States) Delray Beach Tennis Center, Delray Beach, Florida, U.S.	
12	Win	12–0	(United States) Dell Long	KO	2 (6), 3:00	17 Jan 2020	(United States) WinnaVegas Casino & Resort, Sloan, Iowa, U.S.	
11	Win	11–0	(Hungary) Gyorgy Kutasi	TKO	2 (4), 1:16	29 Jun 2019	Városháza tér, Dunaújváros, Hungary	
10	Win	10–0	(Finland) Gennadi Mentsikainen	UD	6	26 May 2018	Isku Areena, Lahti, Finland	
9	Win	9–0	(Bosnia and Herzegovina) Jasmin Hasić	UD	4	22 April 2017	Sporthallen, Sundsvall, Sweden	
8	Win	8–0	(Georgia (country)) Archil Gigolashvili	TKO	2 (4), 1:28	19 Nov 2016	Haninge Boxing Gym, Haninge, Sweden	
7	Win	7–0	(Georgia (country)) David Gegeshidze	TKO	4 (6), 1:17	10 Sep 2016	Baltic Hall, Mariehamn, Finland	
6	Win	6–0	(Denmark) Kim Thomsen	KO	2 (6), 1:52	4 Jun 2016	Frederiksberghallen, Copenhagen, Denmark	
5	Win	5–0	(Lithuania) Pavlo Nechyporenko	TKO	1 (6), 2:46	2 Apr 2016	Hartwall Arena, Helsinki, Finland	
4	Win	4–0	(Lithuania) Dmitrij Kalinovskij	UD	4	19 Dec 2015	Hartwall Arena, Helsinki, Finland	
3	Win	3–0	(Belarus) Artsiom Charniakevich	SD	4	9 May 2015	Ice Hockey Hall, Lapua, Finland	
2	Win	2–0	(Latvia) Edgars Kalnars	UD	4	14 Mar 2015	Night Club HulluPullo, Vaasa, Finland	
1	Win	1–0	(Latvia) Janis Ginters	UD	4	8 Nov 2014	Rocklunda IP, Västerås, Sweden	

== Titles in boxing ==
=== Minor world titles ===
- WBF heavyweight champion (200+ lbs; current)
- Baltic Boxing Union heavyweight champion (200+ lbs; current)
