= Katrín Jakobsdóttir =

Prime Minister of Iceland from 2017 to 2024

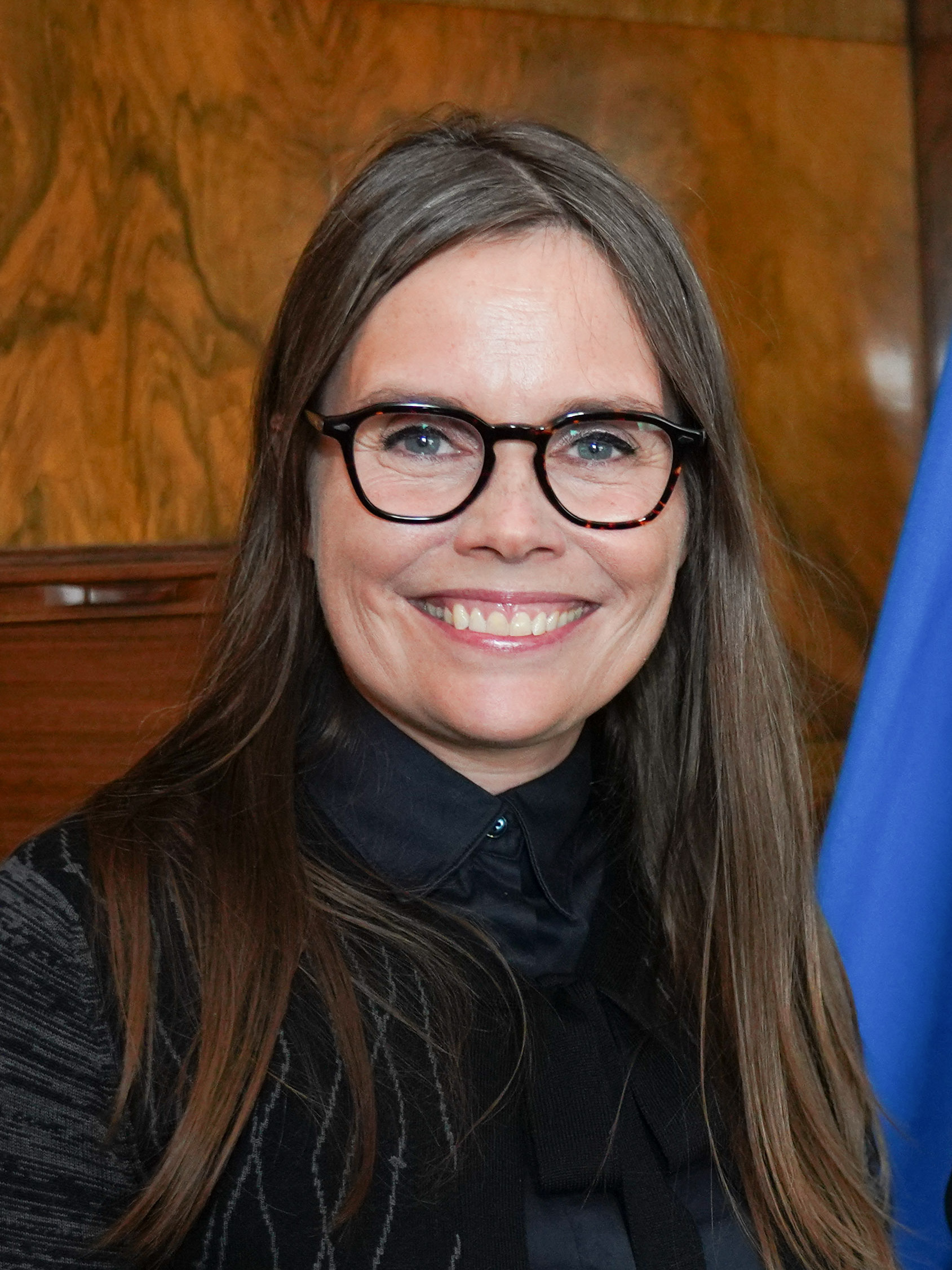
- Katrín in 2023

Prime Minister of Iceland
- In office 30 November 2017 – 9 April 2024
- President: Guðni Th. Jóhannesson
- Preceded by: Bjarni Benediktsson
- Succeeded by: Bjarni Benediktsson

Chair of the Left-Green Movement
- In office 24 February 2013 – 5 April 2024
- Preceded by: Steingrímur J. Sigfússon
- Succeeded by: Guðmundur Ingi Guðbrandsson

Minister of Education, Science, and Culture
- In office 2 February 2009 – 23 May 2013
- Prime Minister: Jóhanna Sigurðardóttir
- Preceded by: Þorgerður Katrín Gunnarsdóttir
- Succeeded by: Illugi Gunnarsson

Member of the Althing
- In office 12 May 2007 – 8 April 2024
- Constituency: Reykjavík North

Personal details
- Born: 1 February 1976 (age 50) Reykjavík, Iceland
- Party: Left-Green Movement
- Spouse: Gunnar Sigvaldason
- Children: 3
- Education: University of Iceland (BA, MA)

Katrín Jakobsdóttir (Icelandic: [ˈkʰaːtʰrin ˈjaːkʰɔpsˌtouhtɪr̥]; born 1 February 1976) is an Icelandic former politician who served as the prime minister of Iceland from December 2017 to April 2024, and was a member of the Althing for the Reykjavík North constituency from 2007 to 2024.

A graduate of the University of Iceland, she became deputy chairperson of the Left-Green Movement in 2003, and served as their chairperson from 2013 until her presidential bid in 2024. Katrín was Iceland's minister of education, science, and culture, and of Nordic cooperation from 2 February 2009 to 23 May 2013. She was Iceland's second female prime minister, after Jóhanna Sigurðardóttir held the office from 2009 to 2013. On 19 February 2020, she was named Chair of the Council of Women World Leaders. In April 2024, she left her position as prime minister, to run for president of Iceland in the 2024 presidential election. She finished in second place, with 25.1% of the popular vote.

Katrín is known as one of the most popular politicians in Icelandic history, with 59% of people naming her as the most trustworthy politician in a 2015 poll. During her time as prime minister, she had the highest approval ratings for a prime minister in Iceland.

== Education ==
Katrín graduated from the University of Iceland in 1999 with a bachelor's degree, with a major in Icelandic and a minor in French.

She went on to complete a Master of Arts degree in Icelandic literature at the University of Iceland in 2004, for a thesis on the work of popular Icelandic crime writer Arnaldur Indriðason.

== Non-political career ==
Katrín worked part-time as a language adviser at the news agency at public broadcaster RÚV from 1999 to 2003. She then freelanced for broadcast media, and wrote for a variety of print media from 2004 to 2006, as well as being an instructor in life-long learning and leisure at the Mímir School from 2004 to 2007. She did editorial work for the publishing company Edda and magazine JPV from 2005 to 2006, and was a lecturer at the University of Iceland, Reykjavík University, and Menntaskólinn í Reykjavík from 2006 to 2007.

== Political career ==
Katrín became deputy chairwoman of the Left-Green Movement in 2003, before she became the chairperson in 2013 which she served until 2024.

She has been a member of the Alþingi for the Reykjavík North constituency since 2007.

Katrín was Iceland's minister of education, science, and culture, and of Nordic cooperation from 2 February 2009 to 23 May 2013.

=== Prime Minister (2017–2024) ===
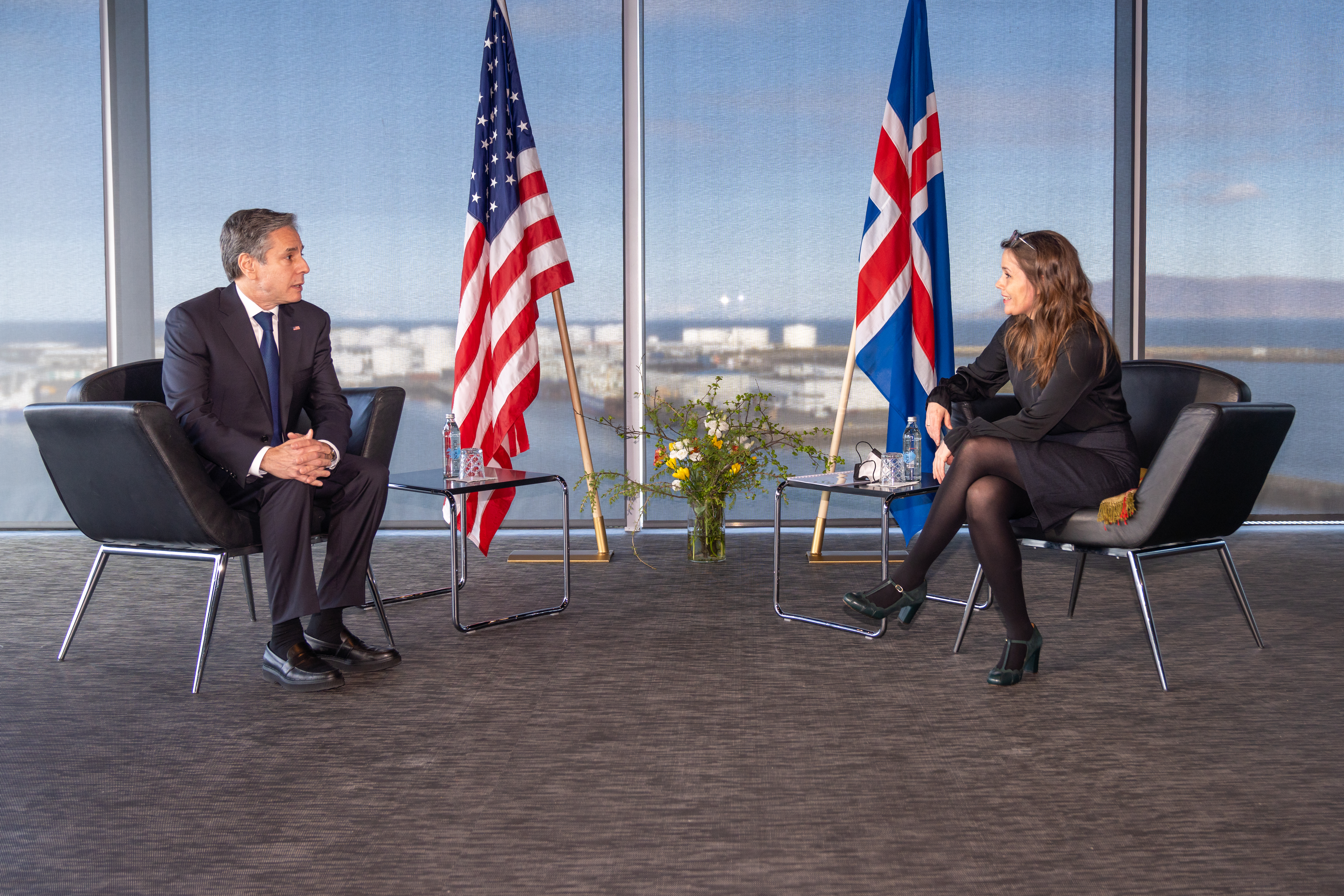
Katrín meets with U.S. Secretary of State Antony J. Blinken in Reykjavík in May 2021

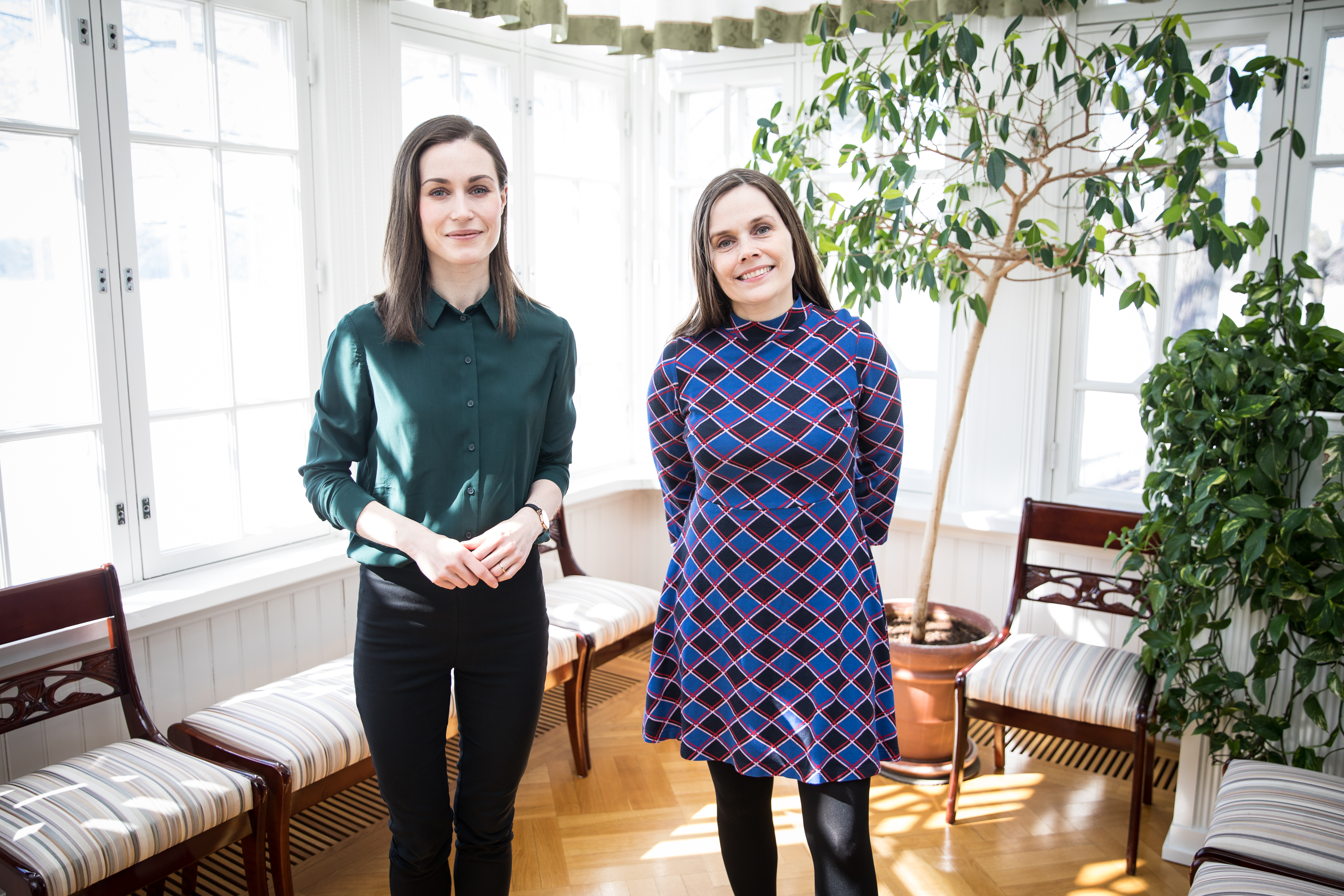
Katrín with Finnish prime minister Sanna Marin at Kesäranta in Helsinki in April 2022

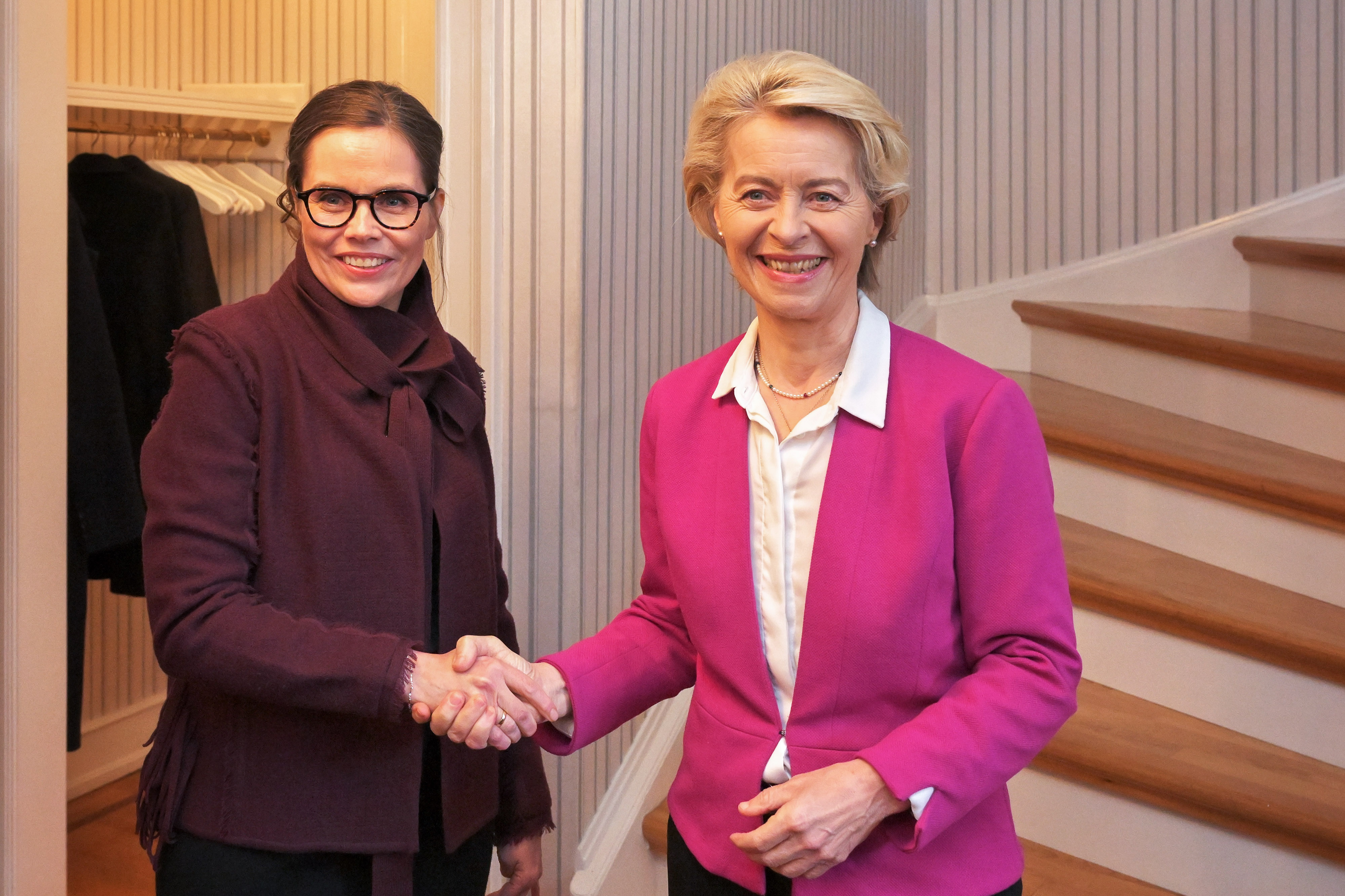
Katrín with president of the European Commission Ursula von der Leyen in Reykjavík in May 2023

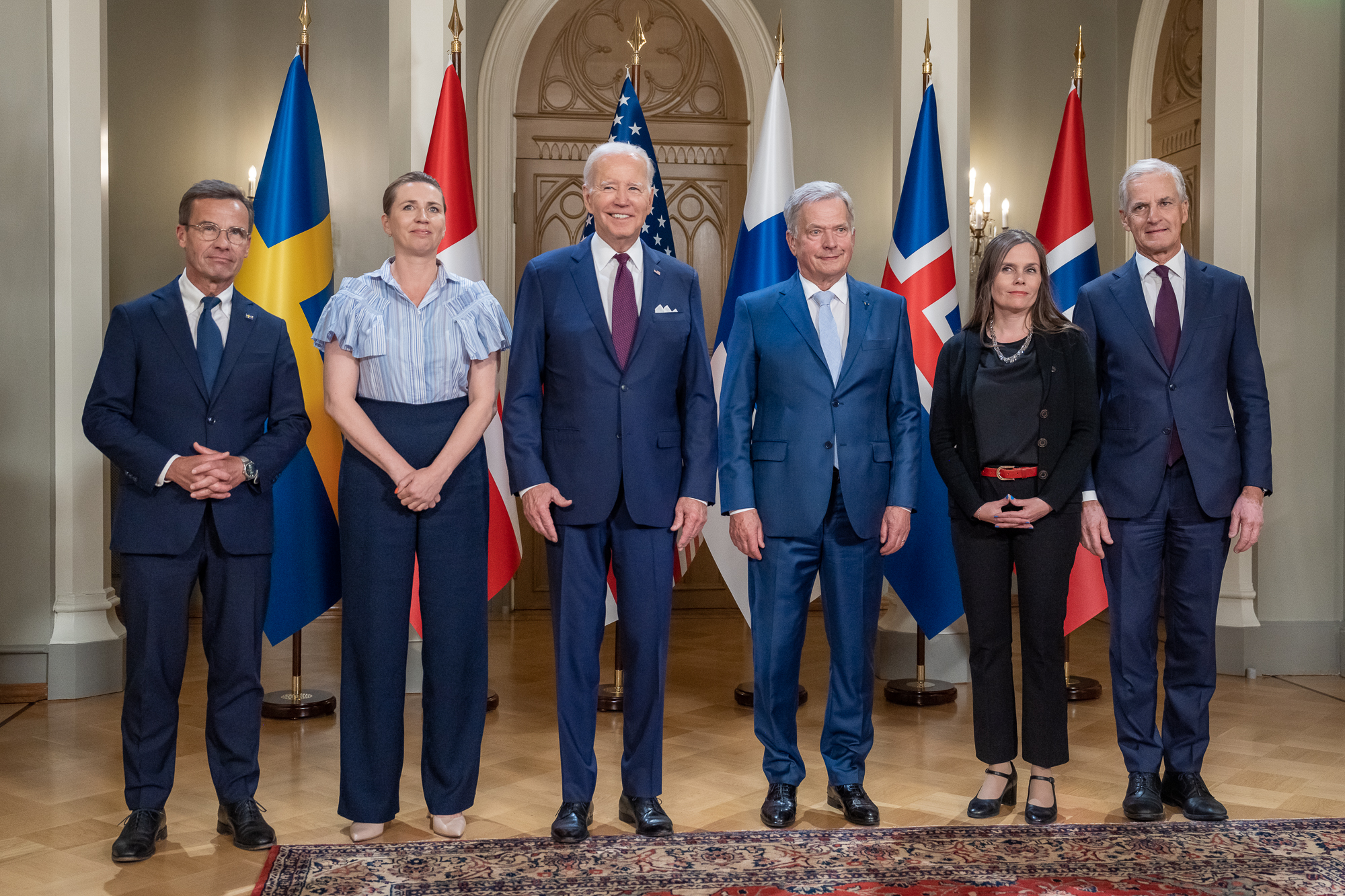
Katrín with U.S. President Joe Biden and other Nordic leaders in Helsinki in July 2023

Before becoming prime minister, Katrín was chairperson of the Left-Green Movement. In the wake of the 2017 Icelandic parliamentary election, President Guðni Th. Jóhannesson tasked her with forming a governing coalition to consist of the Left-Green Movement, the Progressive Party, the Social Democratic Alliance, and the Pirate Party. Coalition talks between the four parties formally began on 3 November 2017, but were unsuccessful because of Progressive Party concerns that her coalition would have too thin a majority. As a result, Katrín sought to lead a three-party coalition with the Independence Party and Progressive Party. After coalition talks were completed, President Guðni formally granted her a mandate to lead the government, which was installed on 30 November.

Political analysts note that Katrín Jakobsdóttir's government has been able to maintain stability through a coalition comprising the Left-Green Movement, the Progressive Party, and the Independence Party. This stability has been attributed to a balanced approach that incorporates different political perspectives, including a focus on regional support and primary industries as well as a cautious stance on European integration.

As prime minister, Katrín has implemented a range of policies aimed at social betterment. These include making the tax system more progressive, investing in social housing, extending parental leave, and taking steps to reduce gender pay inequality. To maintain coalition stability, she has also made some compromises, such as forgoing the establishment of a national park in the country's centre.

By September 2021, nearly four years after taking office, Katrín's leadership during the COVID-19 pandemic received positive reviews. While Iceland's small size and geographical isolation may have contributed to its relatively low death toll, the country's proactive measures under her guidance were also a factor. Tourism was reintroduced cautiously, although there was a subsequent increase in COVID-19 cases.

In the 2021 parliamentary elections, the Left-Green Movement lost three of its 11 seats in the Parliament, but the coalition government still retained its majority. Negotiations among the coalition parties subsequently began to renew their agreement. Polls taken in the aftermath of the election showed a significant majority of Icelanders supported Katrín's continued role in government.

In October 2023, she gained international attention for going on strike with women and non-binary people in calling for pay equality and action against gender-based violence. The strike is also the first of its kind since 1975.

=== Resignation, presidential campaign (2024) and international work ===
On 9 April 2024, Katrín resigned as prime minister and chairperson of the Left-Green Movement and ran for the presidency of Iceland. She came in second place behind Halla Tómasdóttir and received 25.1% percent of votes cast. Katrín said she does not plan to run for the presidency again and will not go back into politics. She now serves as a senior emissary for the Arctic Circle and is the chair of the Polar Dialogue, an initiative within the Arctic Circle. Katrín is also the chair of the Pan-European Commission on Climate and Health organized by the regional office of WHO in Europe.

== Political positions ==
Katrín opposed Icelandic membership of NATO, but as part of the compromise between the Left-Greens and their coalition partners, she stated that the government did not intend to withdraw from NATO or hold a referendum on NATO membership. Katrín also opposed Iceland joining the European Union (EU). The coalition government did not hold a referendum on restarting Iceland's accession negotiations with the EU.

== Personal life ==
Katrín is married to Gunnar Sigvaldason and has three sons (born 2005, 2007, and 2011). Her father, Jakob Ármannsson, was an educator and banker and her mother, Signý Thoroddsen, was a psychologist.

She hails from a family which has produced many prominent people in Icelandic politics, academia, and literature. She is the younger sister of twin brothers Ármann Jakobsson and Sverrir Jakobsson, who are both professors in the humanities at the University of Iceland. Katrín is the great-granddaughter of the politician and judge Skúli Thoroddsen and the poet Theodóra Thoroddsen. Her maternal grandfather Sigurður S. Thoroddsen was an engineer and Member of parliament, representing Ísafjörður during the Second World War. The poet Dagur Sigurðarson is her maternal uncle.

Her debut crime novel Reykjavík: A Crime Story, co-written with best-selling Icelandic author Ragnar Jónasson, was published in October 2022, with an English translation published in September 2023. A second crime novel, Franski spítalinn ("The French Hospital"), also a collaboration with Jónasson, was published in Iceland in October 2025.

== International cooperation ==
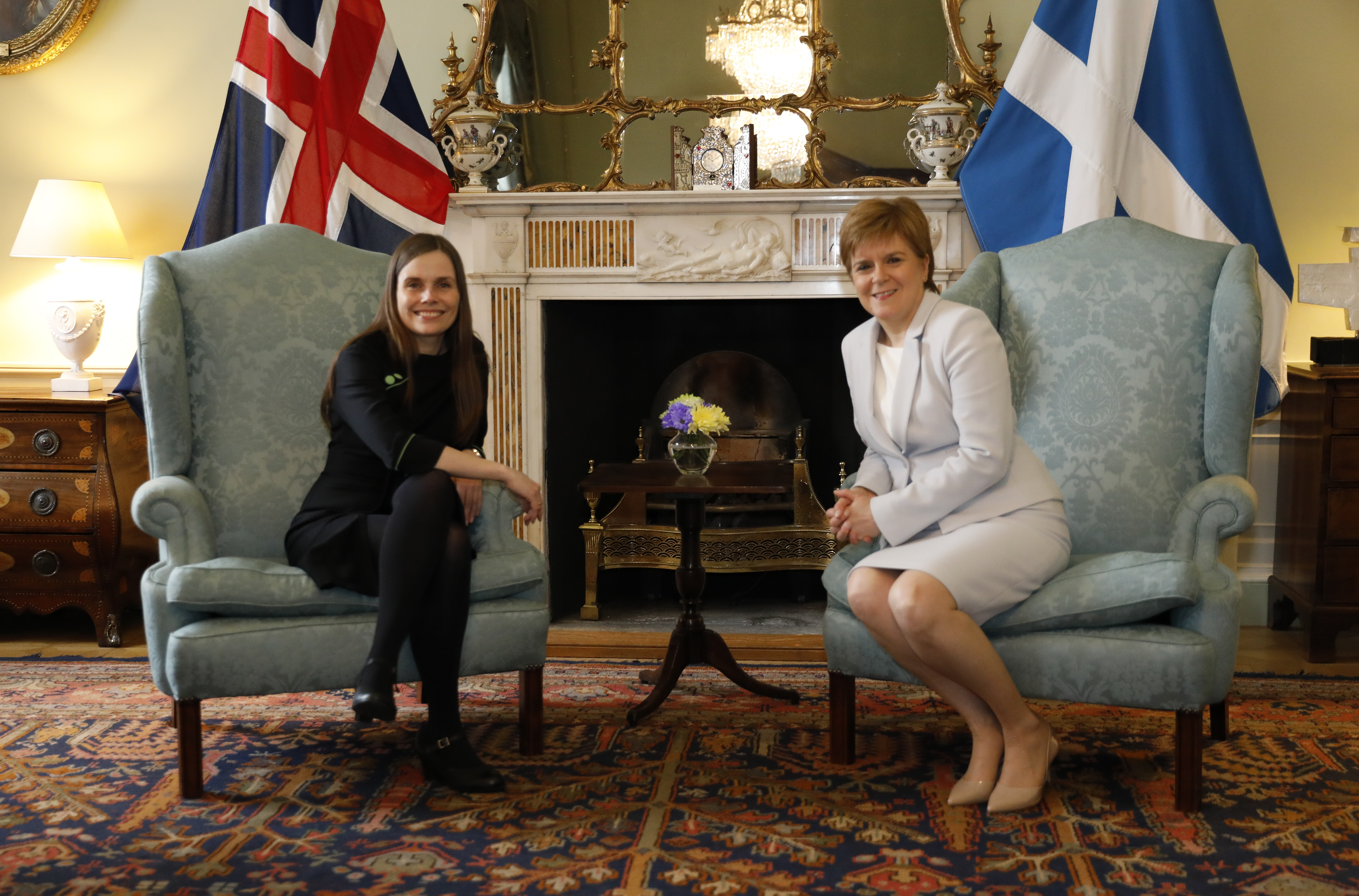
Meeting with First Minister of Scotland Nicola Sturgeon at Bute House in Edinburgh, 2019

Katrín has been a member of the following international organizations or committees:

- Icelandic Delegation to the Council of Europe Parliamentary Assembly (since 2017)
- Icelandic Delegation to the EFTA and EEA Parliamentary Committees (2014–2016)
- EU-Iceland joint Parliamentary Committee (Deputy Chair 2014–2016)
- Icelandic delegation to the West Nordic Council (2013–2014)

Party political offices
Preceded by Steingrímur J. Sigfússon	Chair of the Left-Green Movement; 2013–2024	Succeeded by Guðmundur Ingi Guðbrandsson
Political offices
Preceded by Þorgerður Katrín Gunnarsdóttir	Minister of Education, Science and Culture; 2009–2013	Succeeded by Illugi Gunnarsson
Preceded by Bjarni Benediktsson	Prime Minister of Iceland; 2017–2024	Succeeded by Bjarni Benediktsson
Diplomatic posts
Preceded by Kolinda Grabar-Kitarović	Chair of the Council of Women World Leaders; 2020–2024	Succeeded by Myriam Spiteri Debono
Incumbent
