= Ármann Jakobsson =

Icelandic author and scholar (born 1970)

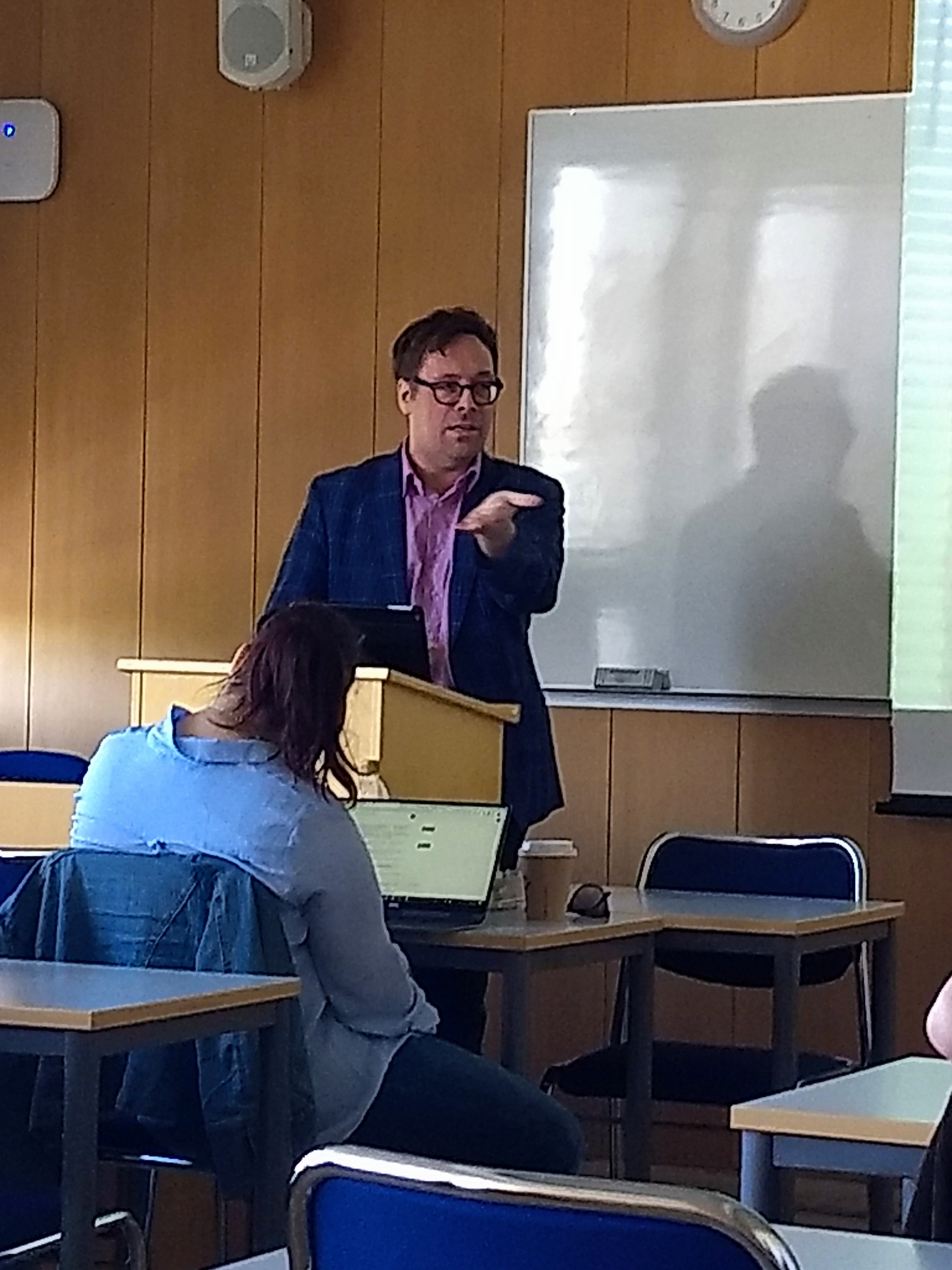
- Born: Ármann Jakobsson; July 18, 1970 (age 56); Reykjavík, Iceland
- Education: Háskóli Íslands (BA, MA, PhD)
- Occupations: Writer, professor of Icelandic literature
- Writing career
- Language: Icelandic, English
- Period: Middle Ages, Modern
- Subjects: Icelandic Literature, Medieval Studies, Medievalism, Paranormal, Disability

Ármann Jakobsson (born 18 July 1970) is an Icelandic author and scholar.

== Biography ==
Ármann was born and raised in Reykjavík, Iceland. His father was a banker and his mother a psychologist. His sister is Katrín Jakobsdóttir, the former prime minister of Iceland. Ármann holds a PhD from the University of Iceland, graduating in 2003. Ármann became a lecturer in Early Icelandic Literature at the University of Iceland in 2008. He was a senior lecturer from 2008–2011, and then a full professor from 2011. From 2022, he is the president of the Icelandic Literary Society and chairman of the Icelandic language commission since 2020. His first novel was published in 2008, and since then he has published eleven works of fiction. He has been nominated twice for the Icelandic literature prize, and was on the IBBY honour list of 2016. Many of his novels engage with medieval and folkloric themes. His first novel was a historical novel taking place in 1908, during the heated debate about Icelandic independence. As a medievalist scholar, Ármann has published extensively on Old Norse literature, focusing on medieval attitudes towards kingship as an institution, childhood and old age, masculinities, paranormal figures and concepts and most recently on disability in the Middle Ages. As a teenager, Ármann competed alongside his twin brother, Sverrir Jakobsson, in the quiz show Gettu betur, winning the competition in 1990. In 2020, he read the most famous of the sagas, Njáls saga, on Icelandic radio. Since 2020, he is the editor of the scholarly journal Andvari.

== Bibliography ==
=== Fiction ===
- Vonarstræti (Hope Street). Novel. (Reykjavík: JPV, 2008).
- Fréttir frá mínu landi: Óspakmæli og örsögur (News from My Country: Microprose and unaphorisms). (Reykjavík: Nýhil, 2008).
- Glæsir (Bull). Novel. (Reykjavík: JPV, 2011).
- Síðasti galdrameistarinn (The Last Witch). Children's book. (Reykjavík: JPV, 2014).
- Brotamynd (Fractals). Novel. (Reykjavík: JPV útgáfa, 2017).
- Útlagamorðin (Outsiders). Crime novel. (Reykjavík: Bjartur, 2018).
- Urðarköttur (Werecat). Crime novel. (Reykjavík: Bjartur, 2019).
- Bölvun múmíunnar, 2 bindi (The Curse of Horemheb, I–II). Young adult novel in two parts. (Reykjavík: Angústúra, 2019–2020).
- Tíbrá (Mirage). Crime novel. (Reykjavík: Bjartur, 2020).
- Goðsögur (Legends). Short stories. (Akureyri: Pastel, 2020; transl. in 2022).
- Skollaleikur (Gaslight). Crime novel. (Reykjavík: Bjartur, 2021).
- Álfheimar 1: Bróðirinn (Fairyland 1: Abduction). Fantasy novel. (Reykjavík: Angústúra, 2021).
- Reimleikar (Apparitions). Crime novel. (Reykjavík: Bjartur, 2022).
- Álfheimar 2: Risinn (Fairyland 2: Giant). Fantasy novel. (Reykjavík: Angústúra, 2022).
- Prestsetrið (The Vicarage). Crime novel. (Reykjavík: Bjartur, 2023).
- Álfheimar 3: Ófreskjan (Fairyland 3: Fiend). Fantasy novel. (Reykjavík: Angústúra, 2023).
- Álfheimar 4: Gyðjan (Fairyland 4: Goddess). Fantasy novel. (Reykjavík: Angústúra, 2024).

=== Non-fiction (selection) ===
- Í leit að konungi: Konungsmynd íslenskra konungasagna (Reykjavík: Háskólaútgáfan, 1997).
- Staður í nýjum heimi: Konungasagan Morkinskinna (Reykjavík: Háskólaútgáfan, 2002).
- Tolkien og Hringurinn (Reykjavík: Forlagið, 2003).
- Illa fenginn mjöður: Lesið í miðaldatexta (Reykjavík: Bókmenntafræðistofnun: Háskólaútgáfan, 2009 [2nd edition, 2015]).
- Morkinskinna I-II, Íslenzk fornrit 23-24 (ed. with Þórður Ingi Guðjónsson) (Reykjavík: Hið íslenzka fornritafélag, 2011).
- Nine Saga Studies: The Critical Interpretation of the Icelandic Sagas (Reykjavík: University of Iceland Press, 2013).
- A Sense of Belonging: Morkinskinna and Icelandic Identity c. 1220, transl. by Fredrik J. Heinemann (Odense: University press of Southern Denmark, 2014).
- Íslendingaþættir: Saga hugmyndar (Reykjavík: Bókmennta- og listfræðastofnun Háskóla Íslands: Háskólaútgáfan, 2014).
- The Routledge Research Companion to the Medieval Icelandic Sagas (ed. with Sverrir Jakobsson) (New York: Routledge, 2017 [2nd paperback edition 2019]).
- The Troll Inside You: Paranormal Activity in the Medieval North (punctum books, 2017).
- Paranormal Encounters in Iceland 1150-1400 (ed. with Mariusz Mayburd) (Boston/Berlin: de Gruyter), 2020.
- Íslenskar bókmenntir: Saga og samhengi, 2 volumes (ed.) (Reykjavík: Hið íslenska bókmenntafélag, 2021).
- Minor Characters in Icelandic Sagas: A Narratological Study (Palgrave Macmillan, 2025).

== See also ==
- List of Icelandic writers
- Icelandic literature
