= Sigurður S. Thoroddsen =

Icelandic politician

Member of the Althing
- In office 1942–1946
- Constituency: Ísafjarðarsýsla

Personal details
- Born: 24 July 1902 Álftanes, Iceland
- Died: 29 July 1983 (aged 81) Reykjavík, Iceland
- Party: Socialist Party
- Education: Reykjavík Junior College; Technical University of Denmark
- Occupation: Civil engineer, politician

Sigurður S. Thoroddsen (24 July 1902 – 29 July 1983) was an Icelandic politician who was a member of the Parliament of Iceland from 1942 to 1945.

== Family ==
He was the grandfather of Katrín Jakobsdóttir, who served as Prime Minister of Iceland from 2017 to 2024.
