= Björn Thoroddsen =

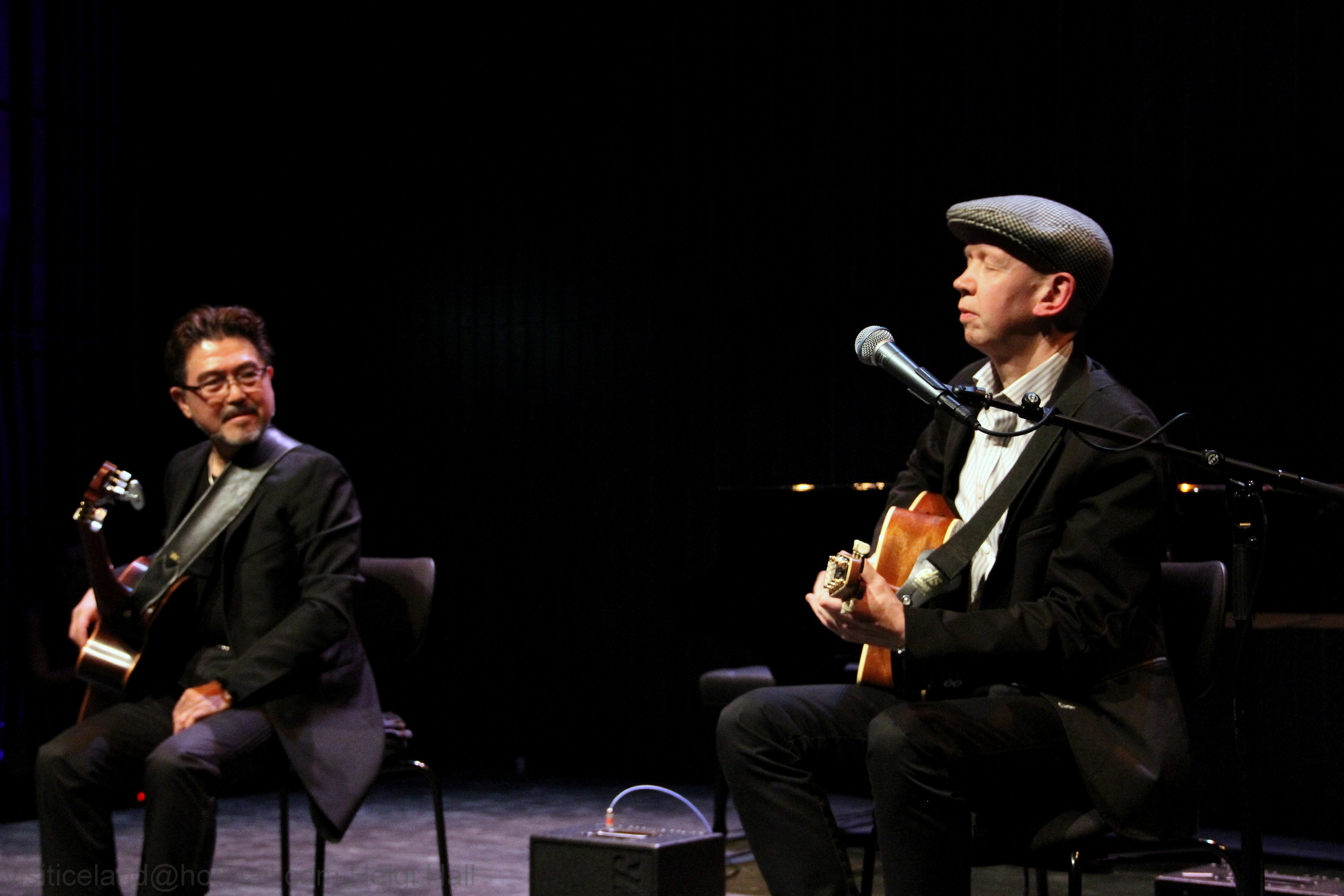
- Thoroddsen (right) in 2011 with Kazumi Watanabe

Background information
- Born: 1958 (age 67–68)
- Origin: Iceland
- Genres: Rock; jazz
- Occupation: Guitarist
- Instrument: Guitar

Björn Thoroddsen (born 16 February 1958) is an Icelandic guitarist. Originally a rock musician, he later focused on jazz.

In his youth, Thoroddsen studied guitar in Iceland. He later attended the Musicians Institute in Los Angeles, California, graduating in 1982.

Thoroddsen has released a number of albums. He has also won several awards in Iceland including being the Jazz performer of the year at the Icelandic Music Awards in 2003, Jazz composer of the year 2005, the city artist of the year in Reykjavik (with the band Guitar Islancio) in 2000 and the city artist of Gardabaer in 2002. Björn's band Guitar Islancio was also the first band in Iceland to receive a gold record for a jazz record in 2003.

Björn has collaborated with many musicians during his career such as Niels-Henning Ørsted Pedersen, Kazumi Watanabe, Tommy Emmanuel, Robin Nolan, Philip Catherine, Didier Lockwood, Jørgen Svare and others.

Today Björn plays mostly as a solo guitarist but has performed with numerous bands. In 2007 Björn founded the Icelandic Guitar Festival, an annual event which has been televised in Iceland. In 2013, Björn organized a similar festival dedicated to guitarists, Guitarama, in Canada and again in 2014.

== 1980s ==
During the 1980s Björn released a total of four solo albums, in all of which he collaborated with Icelandic jazz musicians as well as international musicians. Later on he would focus on performing in several bands. In 1982, shortly after returning home from LA, Björn released his debut solo, and first Icelandic fusion jazz album, (Flight). Two years later in 1984 he released his second, self named, solo album Björn Thoroddsen The following album, Plús (Plus) was released in 1986 and at last the album Quintet.

In 1985, Björn formed Gammar, a jazz fusion group, with four other members; Steingrimur Oli Sigurðarson (drums), Stefan S. Stefansson (saxophone), Björn Thoroddsen (guitar), Thorir Baldursson (keyboards) and Skuli Sverrisson (bass). The band released three albums during its time, in 1985 and 1987 the band released two albums Gammar I & II and a few years later, in 1992, they released Af Niðafjöllum (From the Niða mountains

== 1990s ==
In the end of the last decade Björn met Szymon Kuran a Polish violinist. Together, with Olafur Thordarson, Thordur Hognason, Magnus Einarsson and later Bjarni Sveinbjornsson, they formed the Kuran Swing a band that played jazz music influenced by Django Reinhardt. The band, that was only going to play for a single concert in 1989, was active for 13 years, performed in America and Europe, and "Kuran Swing" music to my ears (2000)

In 1993, Björn formed a band that arranged Icelandic children's songs into a modern jazz style and released the album Göngum svo léttir (Walking so lightly. In 1997, Björn made an album mostly with jazz standards, BT Jazz Guitar, with fellow guitarists; Philip Catherine, Dough Raney, Jacob Fisher, Paul Weeden and Leivur Thomsen.

== 2000s ==
In 1999, Björn formed a band, Guitar Islancio, with fellow guitarist Gunnar Thordarson and Jon Rafnsson on double bass. The band would play jazzed-up Icelandic folk songs, some of which were hundreds of years old, and put them into a modern jazz costume. The band released five albums. Guitar Islancio I (1999), II (2000), III (2001), Connections (2002), Icelandic Folk (2005) and Guitar Islancio (2006). The band became quite popular both in Iceland and abroad and during the decade it traveled all around the world to play.

In 2003, Björn and Danish clarinet player Jörgen Svare made their first album, Jazz Airs, followed by the album Sweet and Lovely in 2005.

In 2004, Björn had an injury to his hand, making him unable to play the guitar for a few months. During this time he arranged the music of the Martin Luther, who formed the Protestant revolution in the 16th century. Björn once again turned Luther's psalms and songs to a modern jazz style and released the album Luther later that year.

During the time Guitar Islancio was performing its music abroad, Björn met Richard Gillis, a Canadian trumpet player. Gillis, who could trace his ancestry back to Iceland, was interested in Guitar Islancio's traditional Icelandic folk music sought after collaborating with Björn on future music projects. Björn and Richard, alongside American double bass player Steve Kirby, formed the band Cold front. The trio played in USA, Canada and Iceland during its heyday. The band released three albums: Cold Front (2005) and Christmas (2005) and Full House (2007). In 2005, Cold Front was awarded the Icelandic Music Award for the Best Jazz Composition.

== 2010s ==
In 2007, Björn organized the first Icelandic guitar festival. The festival turned out to become an accomplished annual event since it began. Björn has invited many Icelandic guitarists and international stars to perform. In 2013 Björn's connections to Canada led him to organize a Canadian guitar festival with similar settings called Guitarama. The Canadian guitar festival achieved success and has become an annual event.

In 2012 Björn performed alongside acclaimed Australian guitarist Tommy Emmanuel in a concert in Iceland. Tommy returned to Iceland in 2014 where he and Björn played together again.

In 2013 Björn arranged a few songs by the Beatles for a single guitar and released an album later that year following a concert tour in Iceland and in North America.

In 2013 Björn and Richard Gillis continued their collaboration and released two albums during a two-year period; Morgana's revenge (2013) and Journey (2014)

In April 2014 Bjorn headlined at Guitarama in Denver at the Swallow Hill Music Hall.

In April 2015 Bjorn headlined a special concert, “Reykjavik Calling - Guitarama,” at Edmonton’s Starlite Room at the 2015 Taste of Iceland event in Edmonton, Canada.

In 2015 Björn hosted the Reykjavik Guitar Festival for the 8th time. The festival has grown into becoming an annual three-day festival that is sponsored by the city of Reykjavík. The 2015 Reykjavík Guitarama featured American guitar legends Al Di Meola and Robben Ford. Björn performed with both of them. The festival was nominated for the Icelandic Music Awards as for the Best Musical Event in the Jazz and Blues category for the year 2015.

In 2016 Björn and Robben Ford continue to work together and record an album in the Sound Emporium Studios in Nashville, Tennessee. The album was produced by Robben Ford and includes original songs by Björn, Robben and Bob Dylan. Thoroddsen and Ford were joined by musicians Jerry Douglas on dobro, Tammy Rogers on violin, Tommy Emmanuel on guitar, Brian Allen on bass and vocalist Anna Þuríður Sigurðardóttir. Sound engineer was Rick Wheeler. A US and Europe tour for 2017 is being organized.
