= Skúli Thoroddsen =

Icelandic judge and politician (1859–1916)

Skúli Thoroddsen (6 January 1859 – 21 May 1916) was an Icelandic judge and politician.

== Career ==
Thoroddsen was a Speaker of the Althing.

== Family ==
He was married to poet Theodóra Thoroddsen. His great-granddaughter is Katrín Jakobsdóttir, the former Prime Minister of Iceland.
