= Witch trials in Iceland =

Historic aspect of criminal justice in Iceland

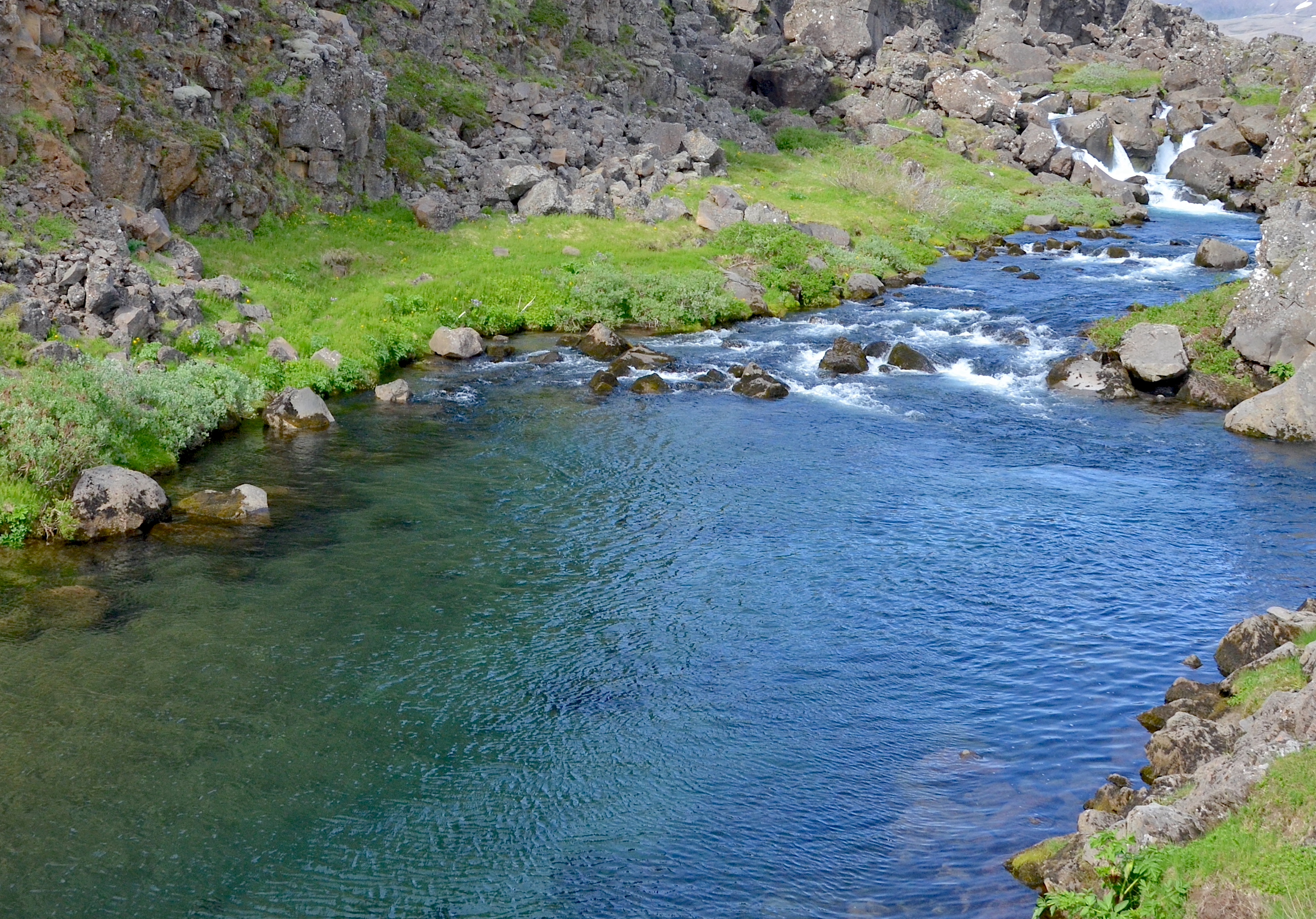
Drekkingarhylur in Þingvellir is one of the places in Iceland where people were executed by drowning.

The Witch trials in Iceland were conducted by the Danish authorities (Iceland then being a Danish possession), who introduced the belief in witchcraft as well as the Danish Witchcraft Act in the 17th century, and then stopped the persecutions. Similar to the case of Witch trials in Latvia and Estonia, the witch trials were introduced by a foreign elite power in an area with weak Christianity, in order to ensure religious conformity. Iceland was uncommon for Europe in that magic as such was viewed favorably on the island, and the majority of those executed were men, which it had in common with only the witch trials in Finland.

== History ==
=== Icelandic view on magic ===
In Iceland, magic and supernatural powers play an important role in popular folk belief. It is divided into two categories. The first category is galdur, good ("White") or bad ("Black") spells performed by galdra-masters by the help of galdrastafir (magic symbols), magic books, runes or vocally. The second category is fjölkynngi which referred to wisdom or knowledge of the unknown, which was necessary to manage and use the galdur correctly, although one can exist without the other. This view on magic is a part of the old Norse culture and it survives on Iceland more undisturbed by Christianization than in the other Nordic countries.

=== The first cases ===
Witchcraft persecution began after the reformation in Iceland, after a decree in 1564 which ordered all bailiffs to report all forms of heresy to the authorities in order to establish religious conformity during the religious reformation.

In the 16th century, however, witch trials in Iceland were conducted in accordance with the old definition of sorcery. In this definition, sorcery had nothing to do with the Devil; rather, it divided magic into black magic and white magic, with black magic being punishable only if it injured another person, and even then did not result in the death penalty.

A typical Icelandic witchcraft case in the 16th-century was that of a priest in 1554, who was sentenced to the loss of his office and exile as punishment for having used black magic or evil galdur from magic books in an attempt to entice a girl to sexual intercourse.

In 1589 it was observed that the population of Iceland, where Christianity was weak, simply did not believe in the Christian Devil, and that consequently, Satan played a very small role in their imagination.

=== Danish influenced witch hunt ===
The international Christian demonology and the Christian interpretation of magic as witchcraft connected to Satan, and the Christian definition of a magician as a witch who was able to master sorcery after a Pact with the Devil, was introduced to Iceland by the clergy (who were often Danes or educated in Denmark) in the 17th century.

Belief in the Devil and the Christian definition of witchcraft spread after the publication of the first witchcraft books by Gudmundur Einarsson in 1627, and Pall Björnsson's Character Bestiae in 1630, and in 1630 Denmark introduced the Danish Witchcraft Act of 1617 on Iceland. This law banned the ownership of magical books among other practices of magic, leading to an unusually larger number of men being executed in the witch trials. One of the first high-profile cases was that of Jón Rögnvaldsson.

Between 1604 and 1720, there were 120 witch trials on Iceland, which resulted in 22 (confirmed) executions between 1625 and 1685. The most intense period of persecution took place in 1667–1685.

=== Male dominance ===
The Icelandic witch trials were uncommon in Europe because almost all were directed toward men: of the 22 executed for sorcery in Iceland, 20 were men and only two women, one of whom (Galdra-Manga) unconfirmed, and only Thuridur Olafsdottir confirmed to have been executed.

The reason for this was that the magic openly performed in Icelandic society had come to be associated with men. Prior to Christianity, women had performed magic, but during the Catholic Middle Ages, this changed as almost only men were accepted in the convents and Latin schools on Iceland and their literacy gave them better opportunities to attain fjölkynngi ('learning').

These male magicians were respectfully referred to as kunnáttumadur ('wise man' or cunning man) and many of them were heroes to the population, such as the famous Jón lærði Guðmundsson (1574–1658), who allegedly managed to turn away the attacks from Barbary slave ships from the coasts by the use of galdur and who managed to survive a number of witch trials in the 1630s.

=== The end ===
In 1683, Sveinn Arnason came to be the last person executed for witchcraft in Iceland. All witchcraft executions stopped in Iceland after 1686, when a new law was passed by Denmark which stated that all death sentences for sorcery were henceforth to be confirmed by the high court in Copenhagen before they could be performed, and Copenhagen refused to confirm any more such verdicts. Klemus Bjarnason was condemned to death of sorcery in 1690, but the execution never took place, and he was transferred to Copenhagen. He died in 1692 while awaiting trial.

== See also ==
- Witch trials in the early modern period
