= Timeline of Icelandic history =

This is a timeline of Icelandic history, comprising important legal and territorial changes and political events in Iceland and its predecessor states. To read about the background to these events, see history of Iceland.

== Overview ==
Settlement
Commonwealth
Norwegian rule
Danish rule
King-
dom
Republic

== 9th century ==
Year	Event
860	Naddoðr discovers Iceland. He was heading to the Faroe Islands but drifted off course and landed near Reyðarfjörður in Iceland. As he returned to his boat it started to snow and thereby he reputedly named the land Snæland (lit. Snowland).
860	Garðarr Svavarsson discovers Iceland. Blown from a storm near the Orkney Islands. He circumnavigated Iceland, thus the first to establish that the landmass was an island. He stayed for one winter in Skjálfandi. He praised the new land and called it Garðarshólmi (lit. Garðar's Islet).
<870	Hrafna-Flóki Vilgerðarson becomes the first Scandinavian to deliberately sail to Iceland as news of a country in the west reached Norway. When Hrafna-Flóki climbed a mountain in Vatnsfjörður he spotted drift ice in a fjord that inspired the name of the country, Ísland (lit. Iceland).
874	Ingólfr Arnarson becomes the first permanent Nordic settler of Iceland. The settlement of Iceland begins.

== 10th century ==
Year	Event
930	The Icelandic Commonwealth is founded with the establishment of the Icelandic parliament (Althing), which had legislative and judicial power, executive power divided between several independent chiefdoms.

== 11th century ==
Year	Event
1000	The Christianisation of Iceland is initiated due to pressure from the King of Norway.
> 1000	The Fifth Court is established as an appellate court for the quarter courts of Iceland.
1056	Ísleifur Gissurarson becomes the first bishop of Skálholt.
1096	A tithe is instigated by the church authorities.

== 12th century ==
Year	Event
1104	The volcano Hekla erupts, resulting in the devastation of Þjórsárdalur.
1106	Jón Ögmundsson becomes the first Bishop of Hólar.
1112	Þingeyraklaustur is founded as the first cloister in Iceland. Jón Ögmundsson, Bishop of Hólar, founded the cloister in 1112 but it was not formally established until 1133.
1122	Ari Þorgilsson begins to write the historical work Book of Icelanders.

== 13th century ==
Year	Date	Event
1208	9 September	The Battle of Víðines takes place. Kolbeinn Tumason is mortally wounded.
1238	21 August	The Battle of Örlygsstaðir takes place. Sturla Sighvatsson and Sighvatr Sturluson are killed.
1244	25 June	The Battle of the Gulf takes place.
1246	19 April	The Battle of Haugsnes takes place.
1253	22 October	The Flugumýri Arson takes place.
1258	Unknown	Gissur Þorvaldsson is appointed Jarl of Iceland by the King of Norway. The appointment aimed to further solidify the king's control over Iceland which was still independent. Gissur Þorvaldsson was also given domain over Southern farthing, Northern farthing and Borgarfjörður which had previously been seceded to the king by their respective chieftains.
1262	Unknown	The Old Covenant is delivered to Iceland. The agreement made Icelanders subjects of the King of Norway and gave Icelanders and Norwegians equal rights in each other's countries. It received its first signatures in 1262 and went into effect in 1264 after receiving its final signatures.

== 14th century ==
Year	Date	Event
1397	17 June	The Kalmar Union is established. The kingdoms of Denmark, Norway, Sweden and their respective dependencies joined in a personal union.

== 15th century ==
Year	Event
1402	The Black Death hits Iceland for the first time. It is estimated that half of the population died in the years 1402–1404.
1433	Jöns Gerekesson, bishop of Skálholt, is killed.
1494	The Black Death hits Iceland for the second time. It is estimated that half of the population died in the years 1494–1495.

== 16th century ==
Year	Event
1501	English merchants plunder Bessastaðir.
1513	Leiðarhólmsskrá.
1522	Sveinsstaðafundur.
1539	Gissur Einarsson is made bishop.
1541	The Skálholt see turns Lutheran.
1550	Bishop Jón Arason and his sons are beheaded in Skálholt.
1551	The Hólar see turns Lutheran.
1559	The English are driven from Vestmannaeyjar.
1571	Guðbrandur Þorláksson becomes bishop of Hólar.
1584	Guðbrandsbiblía, the first Icelandic Bible, is published.

== 17th century ==
Year	Event
1602	The King of Denmark grants Danish merchants monopoly on trade with Iceland.
1615	The Slaying of the Spaniards take place.
1625	The first person, Jón Rögnvaldsson, is burnt alive for witchcraft.
1627	The Turkish Abductions occur. Hundreds of Icelanders are kidnapped by Barbary pirates.
1639	Brynjólfur Sveinsson becomes bishop of Skálholt.
1656	Kirkjuból witch trial.
1656	The Flateyjarbók manuscript is sent to Denmark.
1662	Icelanders are made to accept the absolute monarchy of the King of Denmark.
1666	The Passion Psalms are composed by Hallgrímur Pétursson.

== 18th century ==
Year	Date	Event
1703		First Icelandic census.
1707		The Bubonic plague spreads in Iceland. A quarter of the population dies.
1712		Jarðabók is completed.
1720		The manuscripts of Árni Magnússon are moved to Denmark.
1760		Icelanders start exporting salted fish to Spain.
1783		The Mist Hardships occur. A volcanic eruption at Laki destroys a great deal of the livestock in Iceland, causing famine and misery. 20-25% of Iceland perishes.
1787		Danish trade monopoly ceases.
1800	6 June	The Althing is abolished.

== 19th century ==
Year	Date	Event
1801		The bishoprics of Skálholt and Hólar are united, located in Reykjavík.
1805		The Bessastaðaskóli is founded.
1807		Trade with Danish Iceland all but disappears due to the invasion of the English and their capture of the neutral Danish fleet at Copenhagen; they had credible intelligence that Napoleon using the Continental System was going to seize that fleet and invade England. It was part of the Napoleonic Wars.
1809		Jørgen Jørgensen seizes power in Iceland and declares independence, but is deposed by the Danes shortly afterwards.
1835		The first copy of Fjölnir is published.
1841		Jón Sigurðsson starts publishing New Associated Writings.
1843	8 March	The King of Denmark orders the Althing to be resurrected.
1845	1 July	The Althing is resurrected, and the house of the Menntaskóli í Reykjavík is opened.
1851		National Assembly of 1851.
1855		The Danes grant Icelanders free trade.
1871		The Danish Parliament passes the Stöðulög laws. First women's secondary school Kvennaskólinn í Reykjavík is founded by Thora Melsted.
1874		The King of Denmark visits Iceland and grants Icelanders a constitution. 1000 years of settlement celebrated throughout the country.
1875		First session of the restored Althing which has the power to pass laws. The Askja volcano erupts. The women's association Thorvaldsensfélagið is founded.
1880		The climate grows much colder, driving many Icelanders to emigrate to the New World.
1894		Foundation of the Hið íslenska kvenfélag and the start of the women's movement on Iceland.

== 20th century ==
Year	Date	Event
1907		Foundation of the Icelandic Women's Rights Association.
1915		Universal suffrage.
1916		The political parties Social Democratic Party and Progressive Party are founded.
1918	1 December	Iceland becomes a sovereign, independent nation. The Danish King remains head of state.
1922		Jarðræktarlögin.
1929		The Icelandic Independence Party is founded.
1930	20 December	The Icelandic Communist Party is founded. The Icelandic State Radio begins broadcasting.
1939		Following the occupation of Denmark by Nazi Germany, a national emergency government is formed under Sveinn Björnsson.
1940	10 May	The British invade, violating Icelandic neutrality.
1941	7 July	The United States Army, still officially neutral, replaces the British occupation force.
1944	17 June	Iceland becomes an independent republic, severing the last political ties to Denmark. Sveinn Björnsson becomes president.
1946		The Keflavik Agreement.
1948		Iceland receives Marshall Aid from the United States.
1949	30 March	Riots break out on Austurvöllur.
1949	4 April	Iceland joins the North Atlantic Treaty Organization.
1951		The United States Army establishes a base in Keflavík.
1952	1 August	Exclusive economic zone extended to 4 nautical miles. Ásgeir Ásgeirsson becomes president.
1958		Exclusive economic zone extended to 12 nautical miles.
1963	14 November	Volcanic eruption forms Surtsey.
1966	30 September	The Icelandic State Television begins its first broadcasts.
1968	1 August	Kristján Eldjárn becomes president. Collapse of the fishing industry.
1970	1 January	Iceland joins the European Free Trade Association.
1972		Exclusive economic zone extended to 50 nautical miles.
1973	23 January	Volcanic eruption in Vestmannaeyjar.
1975		Exclusive economic zone extended to 200 nautical miles.
1980	1 August	Vigdís Finnbogadóttir becomes president of Iceland, the first woman in the world to become elected head of state.
1994	1 January	Iceland joins the European Economic Area.
1996	1 August	Ólafur Ragnar Grímsson becomes president.

== 21st century ==
Year	Date	Event
2000	17–21 June	Southern Iceland is hit by two earthquakes, the first 6.6 M_{L} and the second 6.5 M_{L}. There were no fatalities but a few people were injured and there was some considerable damage to infrastructure.
2004	2 June	The president of Iceland, Ólafur Ragnar Grímsson, refuses to sign a bill from the parliament for the first time in the nation's history.
2005	21 March	Bobby Fischer moves to Iceland after being granted an Icelandic passport and full citizenship.
2006	30 September	The United States Army abandons the military base in Keflavík, thus ending a 55-year U.S. military presence in Iceland.
2008	29 May	A doublet earthquake strikes southern Iceland with a composite magnitude of 6.1 M_{W}.
2008	September	Iceland faces financial crisis following the collapse of the country's three major commercial banks.
2009	26 January	After months of rallies outside the parliament building, the Icelandic government resigns.
2009	1 February	After the collapse of the government, Jóhanna Sigurðardóttir becomes the first female Prime Minister of Iceland and the world's first openly gay head of government of the modern era.
2009	16 July	The parliament narrowly passes a bill authorising the government to apply for EU membership.
2010	5 January	The president of Iceland, Ólafur Ragnar Grímsson, refuses to sign a bill from the parliament for the second time in the nation's history.
2010	20–23 March	Volcanic eruption of Eyjafjallajökull.
2011	20 February	The president of Iceland, Ólafur Ragnar Grímsson, refuses to sign a bill from the parliament for the third time in the nation's history.
2011	21–28 May	Volcanic eruption of Grímsvötn.
2016	4 April	Panama Papers reveal that Prime Minister Sigmundur Davíð Gunnlaugsson had links to private companies dealing in offshore tax havens, resulting in a call for a snap election.
2016	1 August	Guðni Th. Jóhannesson becomes president of Iceland.
2024	1 June	Halla Tómasdóttir won the 2024 Icelandic presidential election and assumed office in August.

== See also ==
- Timeline of Faroese history
- Timeline of Swedish history
- Timeline of Reykjavík
- Timeline of LGBTQ history in Iceland
