= Kongla Ann =

17th-century Estonian healer accused of witchcraft

- The memorial for Kongla Ann located at the exterior wall of the Viru-Nigula St. Nicholas Church
- Born: Unknown
- Died: 2 May 1640; Viru-Nigula Parish, Swedish Estonia
- Occupation: Folk healer

Execution of accused witches in Derenburg.

Kongla Ann (died 2 May 1640) was an Estonian woman from the village of Pada, Viru-Nigula parish in Swedish Estonia who was executed for witchcraft and werewolfery. In 1640, the lord of Pada Manor, Hermann Billingshausen, accused Ann of causing the death of his child through magical means.

During the trial proceedings, Ann confessed to possessing the ability to transform into a werewolf and to killing the manor lord, Hermann Billingshausen's child. The confession was likely under duress. The court found her guilty of maleficium and shape-shifting. She was subsequently burnt at the stake in Viru-Nigula. The case occurred during the beginning of a period when Swedish authorities were attempting to consolidate legal control over the local peasantry and suppress non-Christian practices. Her case is cited as an example of how witches were executed as a message to the peasantry and a way to deter the practice of indigenous beliefs.

== Historical context ==
The Estonian witch trials had two distinct chronological phases, with the case of Kongla Ann caught within the transition into the second period. The first phase, of uncertain origin, is suspected to have lasted until the 1640s, while the second period most likely spanned from 1640 into the early 1700s.

Approximately one-third of those accused, including Kongla Ann, were sentenced to death by burning at the stake. Unlike many other European regions, Estonia was a rare exception in which male defendants outnumbered female defendants. Of the 218 known accused individuals, 122 were men, and 84 were women.

Ann's trial and executions were likely part of a larger strategy by authorities to promote Christianity among the local population, as these trials often reflected a clash between the official Christian doctrine of the Swedish colonial power and the indigenous practices of the peasantry. Village healers were viewed as necessary specialists comparable in social utility to blacksmiths or millers and possessed knowledge about local plants and animals. Following the Reformation, rising social fears could lead to accusations of maleficium.

The vilification of werewolves in folklore may have been deepened by the stark differences between Estonian peasant beliefs about werewolves and those held by Swedish and German authorities. Estonian peasant women likely had domestic influence within traditional family structures that may have clashed with the gender expectations of the Swedish ruling class. The demonisation of werewolves and their predatory attacks on livestock can be seen as a symbolic metaphor for resistance to Christianity, with Christians often being represented as sheep or lamb.

== Trial ==
The 1640 trial of Kongla Ann was recorded and is preserved in the Tallinn City Hall Archives. The transcript gained public attention in 1825 when Otto Wilhelm Masing, a church minister and linguist who worked in Viru-Nigula, published the protocols in Marahwa Näddala-Leht. The proceedings began at Pada Manor in the Mahu (Viru-Nigula) parish following a complaint by the manor lord, Hermann Billingshausen. He accused Ann of using magic to kill his infant child, whose wet nurse was Ann's daughter.

=== Interrogation and confessions ===
Under judicial torture involving thumbscrews and ropes, Ann provided a testimony that integrated numerous regional folklore motifs. When questioned by Judge Heinrich Strieck about her origins and spiritual life, she claimed to have arrived from Finland 12 years prior but had avoided the Eucharist because "Satan forbade her", appearing to her as a "tall black man".

The transcript details specific admissions of shape-shifting and harmful magic. Ann claimed to have run as a werewolf with an accomplice named Gherdt (in Estonian, Kärt). She alleged they hid their wolf skins under a large stone in the Varudi field and harmed only dogs while in werewolf form. She confessed to being carried through the air by Satan to set fire to the Otto Wrangell mansion using "fireflies." Ann claimed she entered the infant's room as an invisible dog and struck the child three times with a stick. She also admitted to returning later to try a cure with charcoal and water, a standard folk-healing practice. Ann's admissions may have been a strategy to shield her daughter, who was the child's wet nurse, from murder charges. In modern day, there is an acknowledgment that she might have been providing a confession that aligned with what she understood were the expectations of witchcraft, so she could divert the legal responsibility away from her daughter and toward herself.

=== Execution ===
The death warrant was signed on 2 May 1640 by local officials, including Heinrich Strieck, Christopher von Wulf-Ramsdorff, and Otto Wrangell. It is widely accepted that Ann was executed by burning at the stake. Masing identified the execution site as a man-made hill approximately 500 metres from the Viru-Nigula church, historically known by locals as the Blue Hill.

== Legacy ==
Incantation

Nature our father,
We are his children,
in the name of the spirit of tribe
Look after us and protect us.

— Recited by Vigala Sass
Memorial stone dedication to Kongla Ann
Viru-Nigula, 1990

In the 20th century, Kongla Ann's story was reclaimed as a symbol of indigenous Estonian identity. In May 1989, in the Viru-Nigula parish, 150 oak trees were planted under the guidance of spiritual leaders. In 1990, on the 350th anniversary of her death, a memorial stone was unveiled behind the Viru-Nigula churchyard by local heritage societies and the Estonian native religion group Maavalla Koda dedicated to Kongla Ann. The dedication included a public rite of incantation led by Vigala Sass, member of the Estonian native religion, Maausk, and part of Maavalla Koda.

On 2 May 2006, a ceremony sparked controversy when the Virumaa Museums Foundation, the Viru-Nigula Lutheran Church congregation, and the Viru-Nigula municipality organized the burning of a straw effigy to mark the signing of a cooperation agreement. The Maavalla Koda condemned the act as a "symbolic repeated murder" of a local healer and a manifestation of "violent Christian fundamentalism."

== See also ==
- Põlula witch trials in Estonia
- Estonian neopaganism
- Estonian folklore
- Witch trials in Latvia and Estonia
- List of people executed for witchcraft
