= Heikki Jauhopää =

Person executed for witchcraft in Finland in 1586

Heikki Jauhopää (died 1586) was a Finnish cunning man who was executed for witchcraft.

An early victim of the witch trials in Finland, Jauhopää was widely known for his ability and feared because he was rumoured to use it for malign purposes.

Jauhopää went on trial in Kemi, accused of having caused the death of several people by magic. He was accused by three different people, who claimed that he had caused the illness and death of a daughter, a farmhand and two cows respectively, after having had some kind of conflict with Jauhopää. His own wife Maarit testified against him, and stated that she had left him but had been forced to return after he had caused her to give birth to snakes.

In Finland, witch trials were normally against a single male folk magician who was accused of having caused death or illness by use of magic, without any reference to Satan. However, normally the man was given a lesser punishment than the death penalty. Because Jauhopää was considered unusually dangerous, he was sentenced to death by decapitation for having caused death by use of magic on 9 July 1586.

== See also ==
- Witch trials in Finland
- Antti Lieroinen
