= List of common misconceptions about history =

Each entry on this list of common misconceptions is worded as a correction; the misconceptions themselves are implied rather than stated. These entries are concise summaries; the main subject articles can be consulted for more detail.

== Ancient history ==
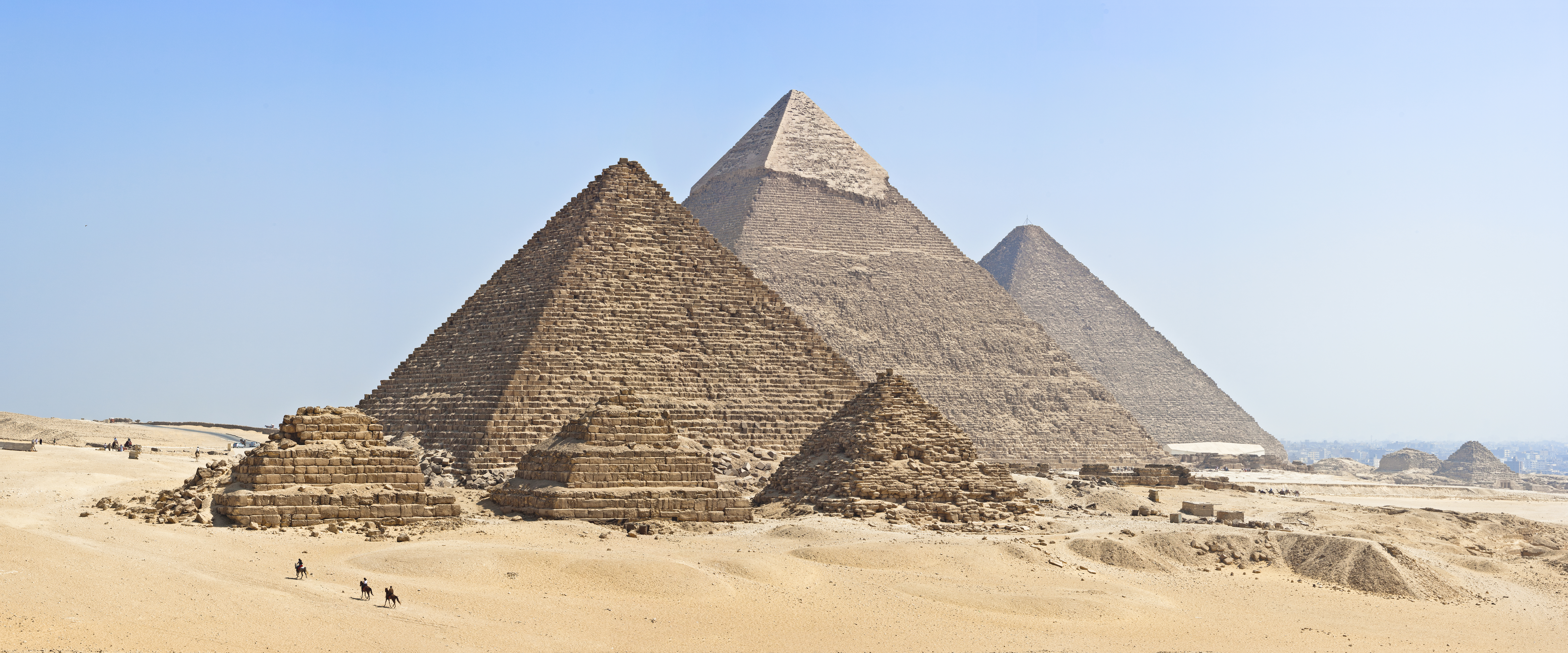
The three main pyramids at Giza, together with subsidiary pyramids and the remains of other structures

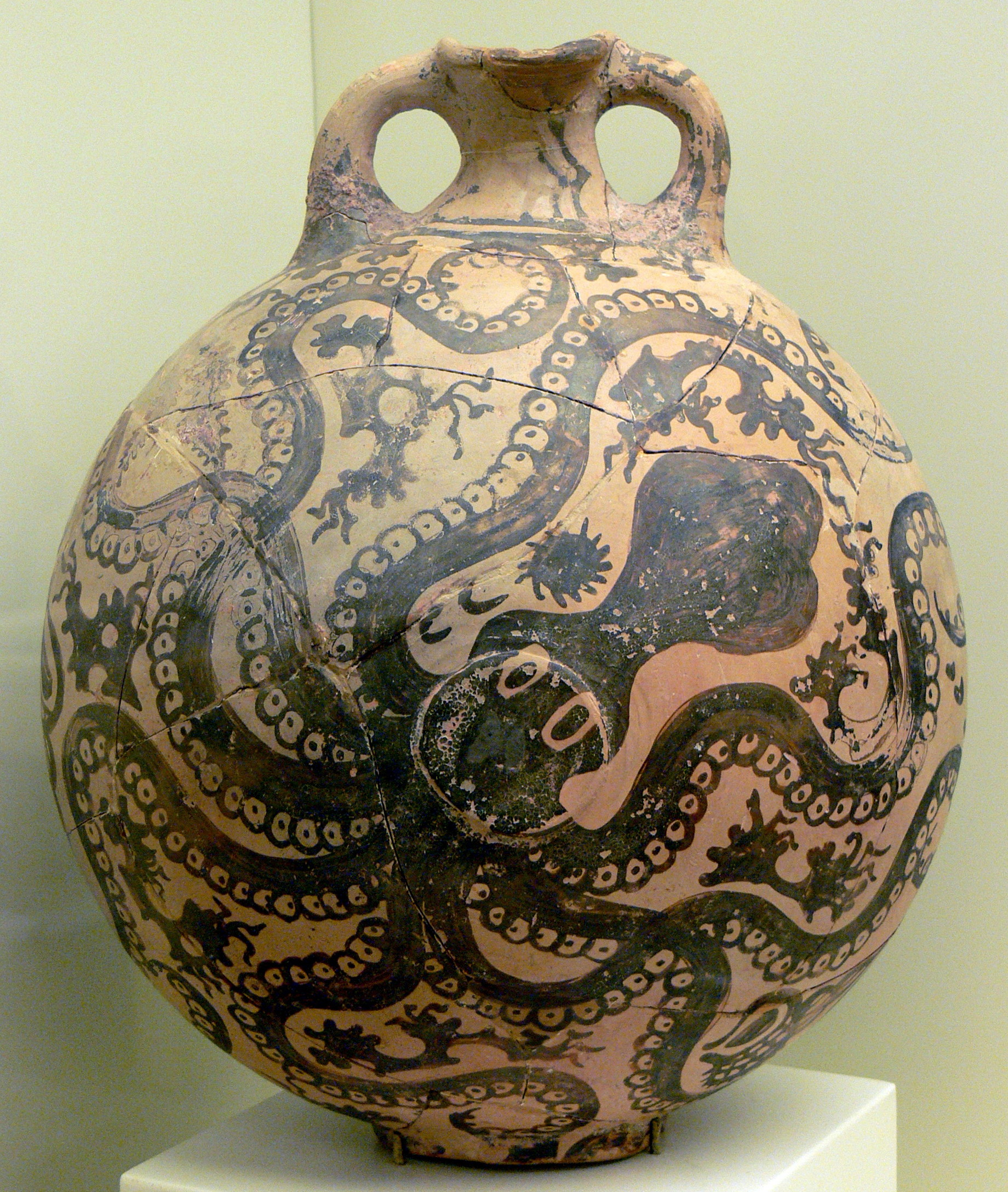
Minoan marine style pottery, often regarded as a high point in Minoan art, was not developed until after the eruption of Thera.

- The Pyramids of Egypt were not constructed with slave labor. Archaeological evidence shows that the laborers were a combination of skilled workers and poor farmers working in the off-season with the participants paid in high-quality food and tax exemptions. The idea that slaves were used originated with Herodotus, and the idea that they were Israelites arose centuries after the pyramids were constructed.
- Galleys in ancient times were not commonly operated by chained slaves or prisoners, as depicted in films such as Ben Hur, but by paid laborers or soldiers, with slaves used only in times of crisis, in some cases even gaining freedom after the crisis was averted. Ptolemaic Egypt was a possible exception. Other types of vessels, such as Roman merchant vessels, were manned by slaves, sometimes even with slaves as ship's master.
- Tutankhamun's tomb is not inscribed with a curse on those who disturb it. This was a media invention of 20th-century tabloid journalists.
- The Minoan civilization was not destroyed by the eruption of Thera, nor was it the inspiration for Plato's parable of Atlantis. The eruption did destroy some settlements such as Akrotiri on Thera and may have contributed to regional social shifts, but its direct impact on Crete was limited, and the period following the eruption is often considered the high point of Minoan civilization.

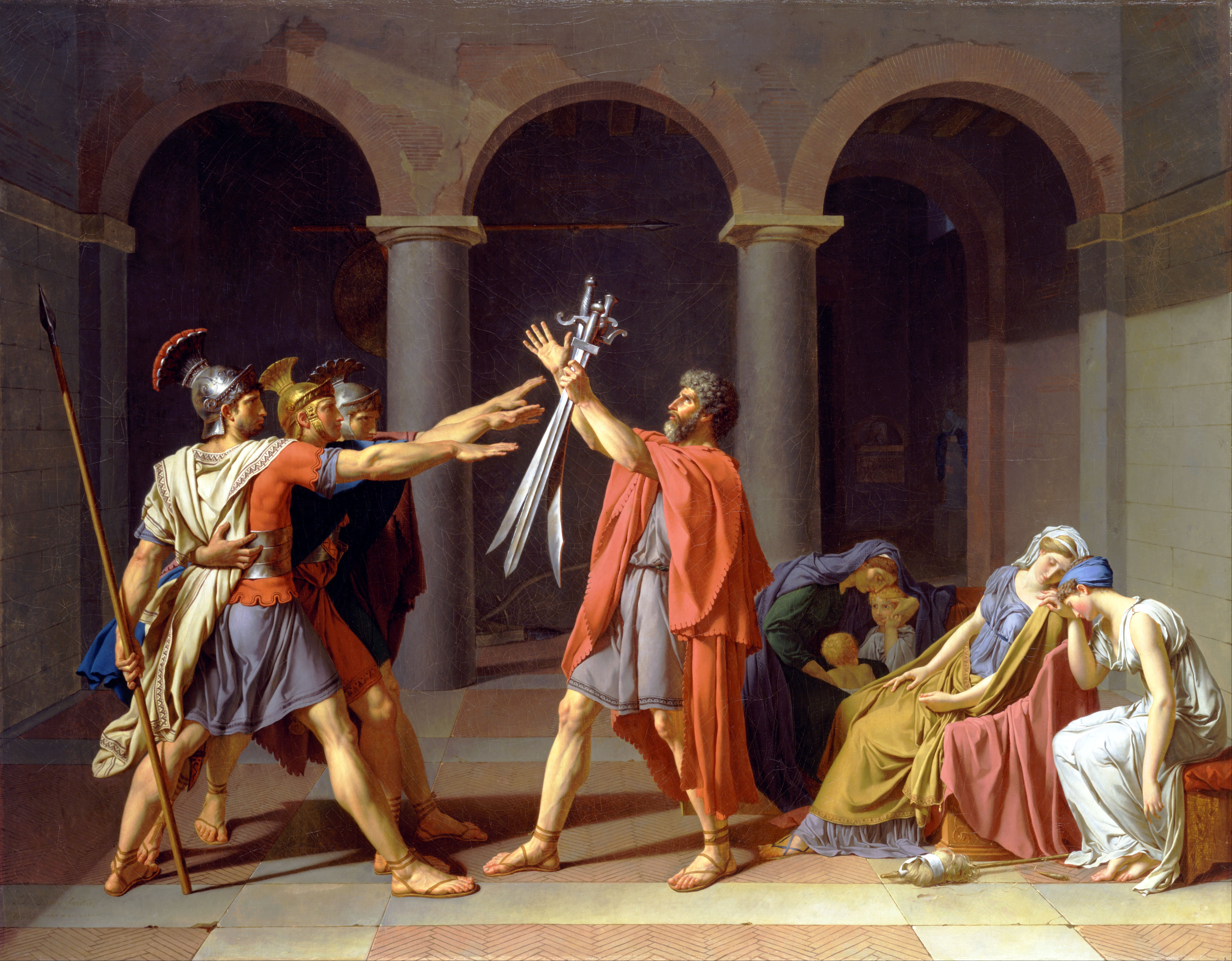
The ancient Romans did not use the Roman salute depicted in The Oath of the Horatii (1784).

- The ancient Greeks did not use the word "idiot" (Ancient Greek: ἰδιώτης, romanized: idiṓtēs) to disparage people who did not take part in civic life. An ἰδιώτης was simply a private citizen as opposed to a government official. The word also meant any sort of non-expert or layman, then later someone uneducated or ignorant, and much later to mean stupid or mentally deficient.

=== Ancient Rome ===
- The so-called Roman salute, in which the arm is fully extended forwards or diagonally with palm down and fingers touching, was not used in ancient Rome. The gesture was first associated with ancient Rome in the 1784 painting The Oath of the Horatii by the French artist Jacques-Louis David, which inspired later salutes, most notably the Nazi salute.

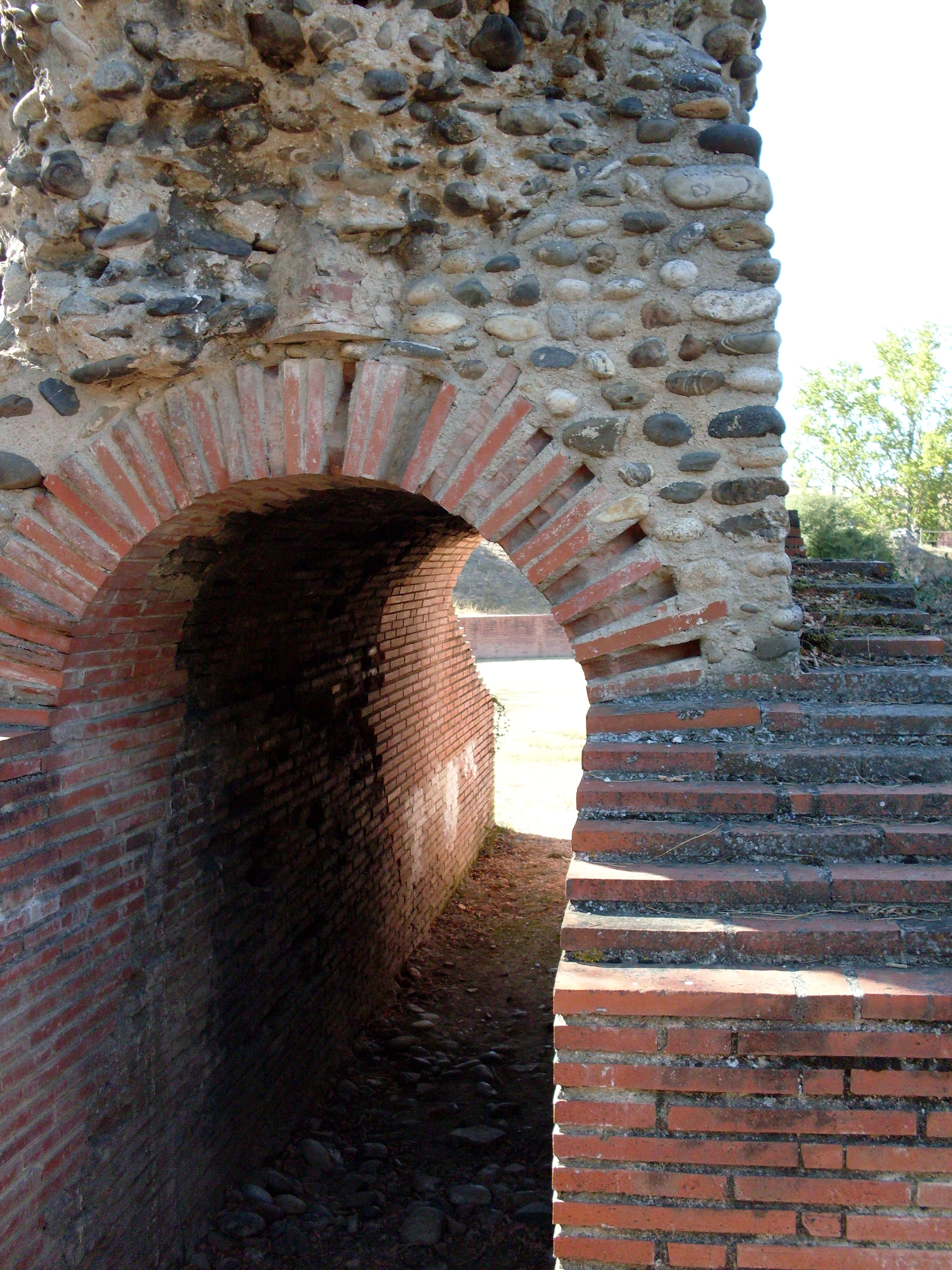
A vomitorium in a Roman amphitheater

- Wealthy Ancient Romans did not use rooms called vomitoria to purge food during meals so they could continue eating and vomiting was not a regular part of Roman dining customs. A vomitorium is a passageway out of a stadium allowing quick exit at the end of an event. Both "vomit" and "vomitorium" derive from a Latin term meaning "to spew forth".
- Scipio Aemilianus did not sow salt over the city of Carthage after defeating it in the Third Punic War.
- Julius Caesar was not born via caesarean section. Such a procedure would have been fatal to the mother at the time, and Caesar's mother was still alive when he was 45 years old.
- There is no proof that Julius Caesar ever said "Et tu, Brute?" ("You too, Brutus?") during his assassination. Instead, the prevailing theories are that he remained silent, or that his last words were "καὶ σύ, τέκνον?" ("You too, child?"). The popular misconception comes from the play Julius Caesar by William Shakespeare.
- Roman soldiers were not paid in salt, although the word salary comes from the Latin salarium 'related to salt'. A salarium may have been a salt allowance, but even that is not supported by ancient sources.

== Middle Ages ==
=== Europe ===
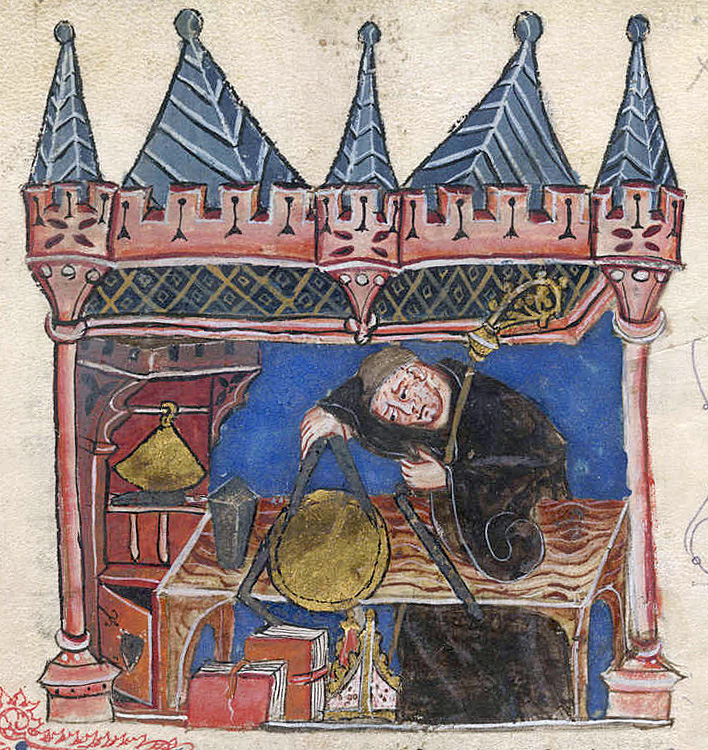
A medieval scholar making precise measurements in a 14th-century manuscript illustration

- The Middle Ages were not "a time of ignorance, barbarism and superstition"; the term "Dark Ages" is rejected by modern historians.
- Adults in the Middle Ages did not die in their 30s or 40s on average, as it is commonly inferred from the life expectancy of the time. While such an estimate was the life expectancy at birth, this was skewed by high infant and adolescent mortality. The life expectancy among adults was much higher; a 21-year-old man in medieval England, for example, could expect to live to the age of 64.
- In the tale of King Canute and the tide, the king did not command the tide to reverse in a fit of delusional arrogance. According to the story, his intent was to prove to sycophantic advisors that no man is all-powerful, and that all people must bend to forces beyond their control, such as the tides.
- There is no evidence that jus primae noctis ("the right of the first night")—a supposed legal right for a lord to sleep with a bride on her wedding night—ever existed in the Middle Ages.

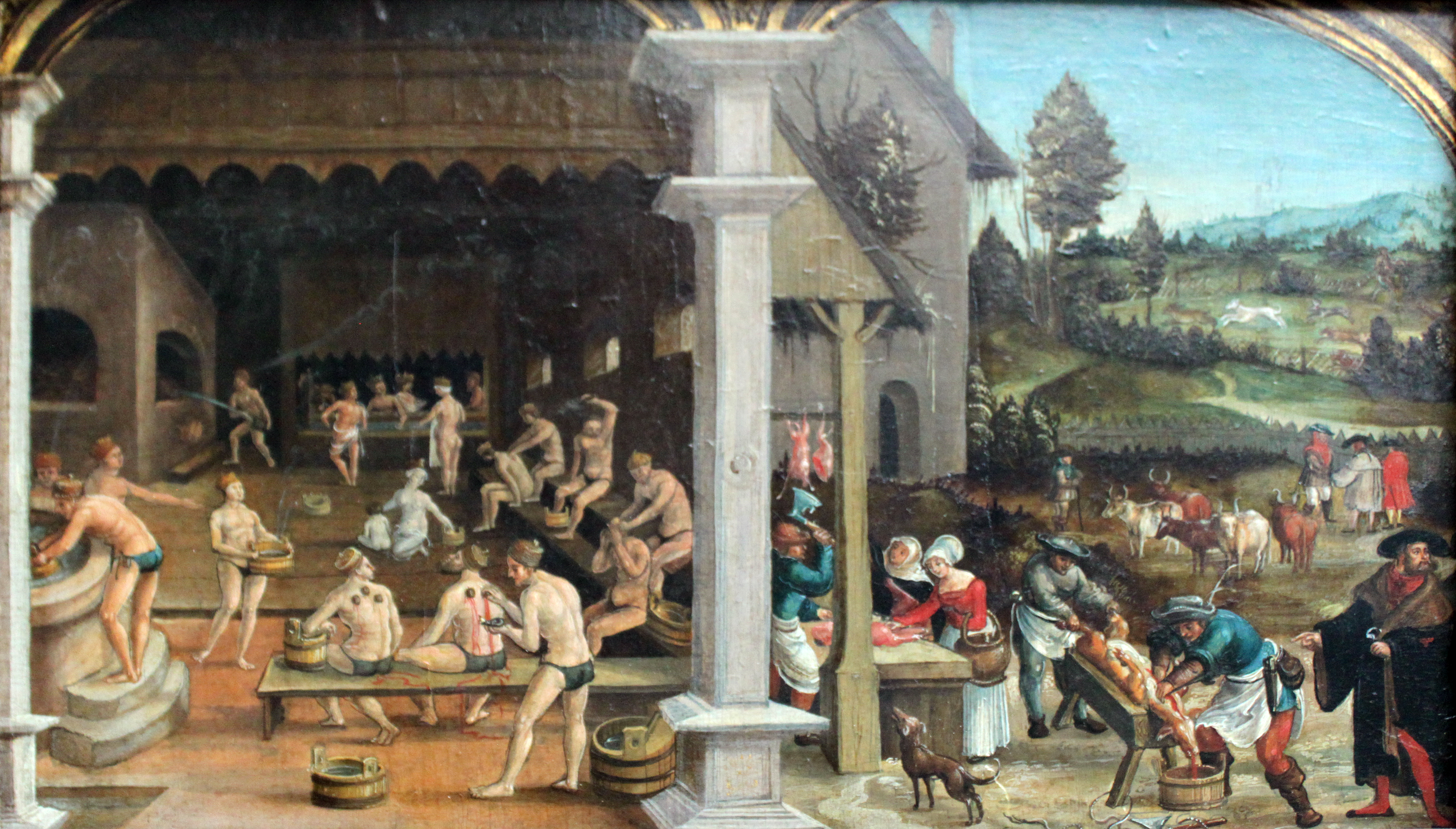
Mixed-gender bathhouse (or Badehaus) in Germany in the early 16th century

- While it was indeed a common belief that disease was caused primarily by contaminated air, it is false that people in the Middle Ages refrained from bathing out of fear of opening pores and catching diseases. Throughout the Middle Ages, public bathhouses were common, particularly in large towns and cities, serving as significant social hubs.
- There is no evidence that iron maidens were used for torture, or even yet invented, in the Middle Ages. Instead they were pieced together in the 18th century from several artifacts found in museums, arsenals and the like to create spectacular objects intended for commercial exhibition.
- Spiral staircases in castles were not designed in a clockwise direction to hinder right-handed attackers. While clockwise spiral staircases are more common in castles than anticlockwise, they were even more common in medieval structures without a military role, such as religious buildings.
- The plate armor of European soldiers did not stop soldiers from moving around or necessitate a crane to get them into a saddle. They needed to be able to fight on foot in case they could not ride their horse and could mount and dismount without help. However, armor used in tournaments in the late Middle Ages was significantly heavier than that used in warfare.
- Whether chastity belts, devices designed to prevent women and men from having sexual intercourse, were invented in medieval times is disputed by modern historians. Most existing chastity belts are now thought to be deliberate fakes from the 19th century.

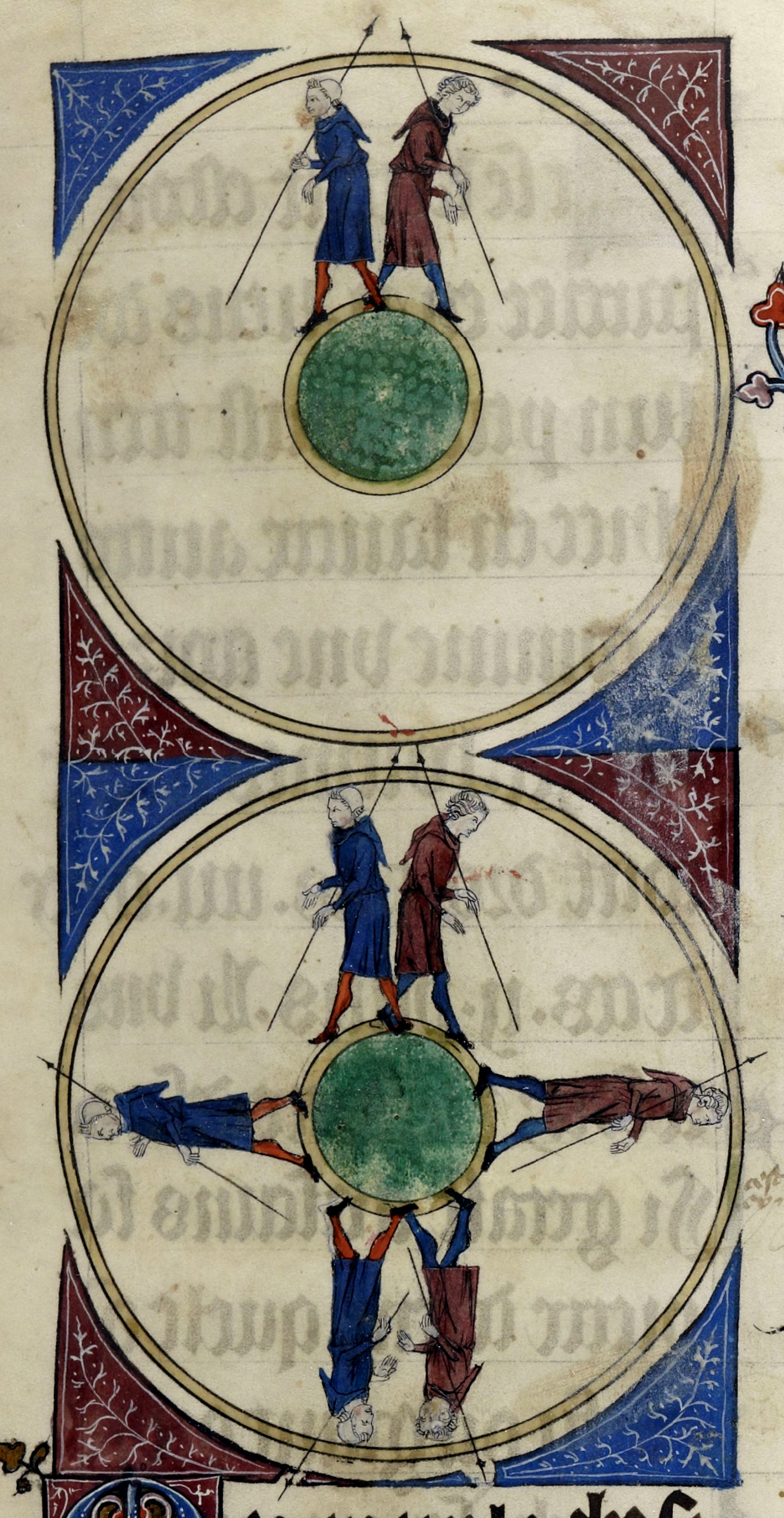
Medieval depiction of a spherical Earth

- Medieval European scholars did not believe the Earth was flat. Scholars have known the Earth is spherical since at least the sixth century BCE. However, most Medieval Europeans did believe that the sun revolved around the Earth, which was first challenged by astronomers such as Nicolaus Copernicus and Galileo Galilei.
- Medieval cartographers did not regularly write "here be dragons" on their maps. The only maps from this era that have the phrase inscribed on them are the Hunt-Lenox Globe and the Ostrich Egg Globe, next to a coast in Southeast Asia for both of them. Maps in this period did occasionally have illustrations of mythical or real animals.
- Christopher Columbus' efforts to obtain support for his voyages were not hampered by belief in a flat Earth, but by worries that the East Indies were farther than Columbus presumed. In fact, Columbus grossly underestimated the Earth's circumference because of two calculation errors. The myth that Columbus proved the Earth was round was propagated by authors like Washington Irving in A History of the Life and Voyages of Christopher Columbus.
- Columbus was not the first European to visit the Americas: Leif Erikson, and possibly other Norsemen before him, explored Vinland, an area of coastal North America. Excavations at L'Anse aux Meadows prove that at least one Norse settlement was built in Newfoundland, confirming a story in the Saga of Erik the Red.
- The Norse did not name Iceland "Iceland" as a ploy to discourage oversettlement. According to the Sagas of Icelanders, Hrafna-Flóki Vilgerðarson saw icebergs on the island when he traveled there, and named the island after them. Popular legend holds that Greenland was named in the hopes of attracting settlers.
- The Plague doctor costume featuring the iconic beak had not been worn in the Middle Ages, but much later, in the 17th and 18th century; and even then is was not very common.

=== Vikings ===
- There is no evidence that Viking warriors wore horns on their helmets, with which they are typically depicted in popular fiction; this would have been impractical in battle.
- Vikings did not drink out of the skulls of vanquished enemies. This was based on a mistranslation of the skaldic poetic use of ór bjúgviðum hausa (branches of skulls) to refer to drinking horns.

== Early modern ==
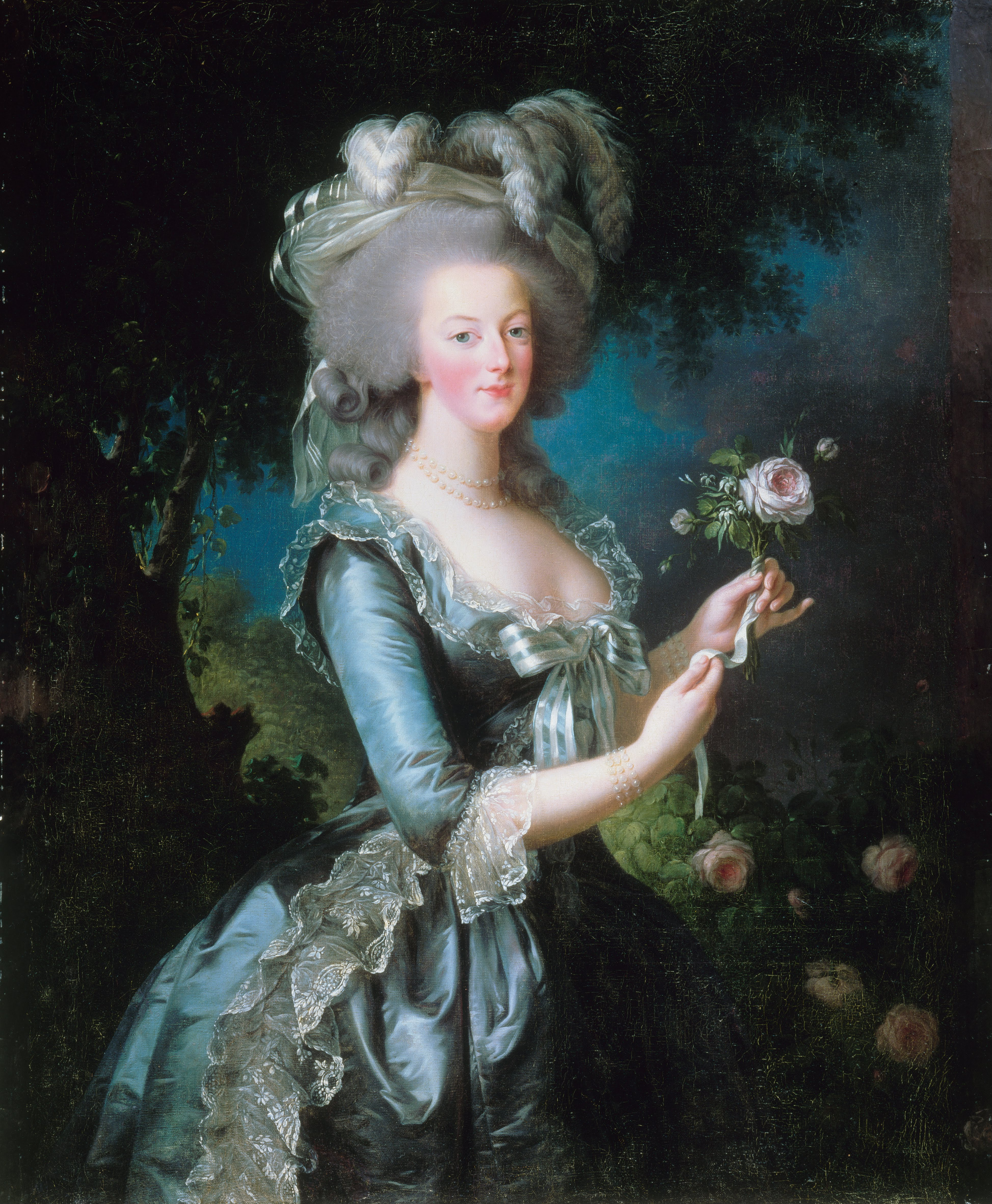
The phrase "let them eat cake" is misattributed to Marie Antoinette.

- The Mexica people of the Aztec Empire did not mistake Hernán Cortés and his landing party for gods during Cortés' conquest of the empire. This notion came from Francisco López de Gómara, who never went to Mexico and concocted the myth while working for the retired Cortés in Spain years after the conquest.
- The elite of the Dutch Golden Age wore black clothes primarily as a status symbol rather than out of Puritan self-restraint. The clothes attracted status from the difficulty of the dyeing process and the cost of elaborate embellishments.
- Shah Jahan, the Indian Mughal Emperor who commissioned the Taj Mahal, did not cut off the hands of the rumored 40,000 workers or lead designers so as to not allow the construction of another monument more beautiful than the Taj Mahal. This is an urban myth that goes back to the 1960s.
- The story that Isaac Newton was inspired to research the nature of gravity when an apple fell on his head is almost certainly apocryphal. All Newton himself ever said was that the idea came to him as he sat "in a contemplative mood" and "was occasioned by the fall of an apple".
- Marie Antoinette did not say "let them eat cake" when she heard that the French peasantry was starving due to a shortage of bread. The phrase was first published in Rousseau's Confessions, written when Marie Antoinette was only nine years old and not attributed to her, just to "a great princess". It was first attributed to her in 1843.

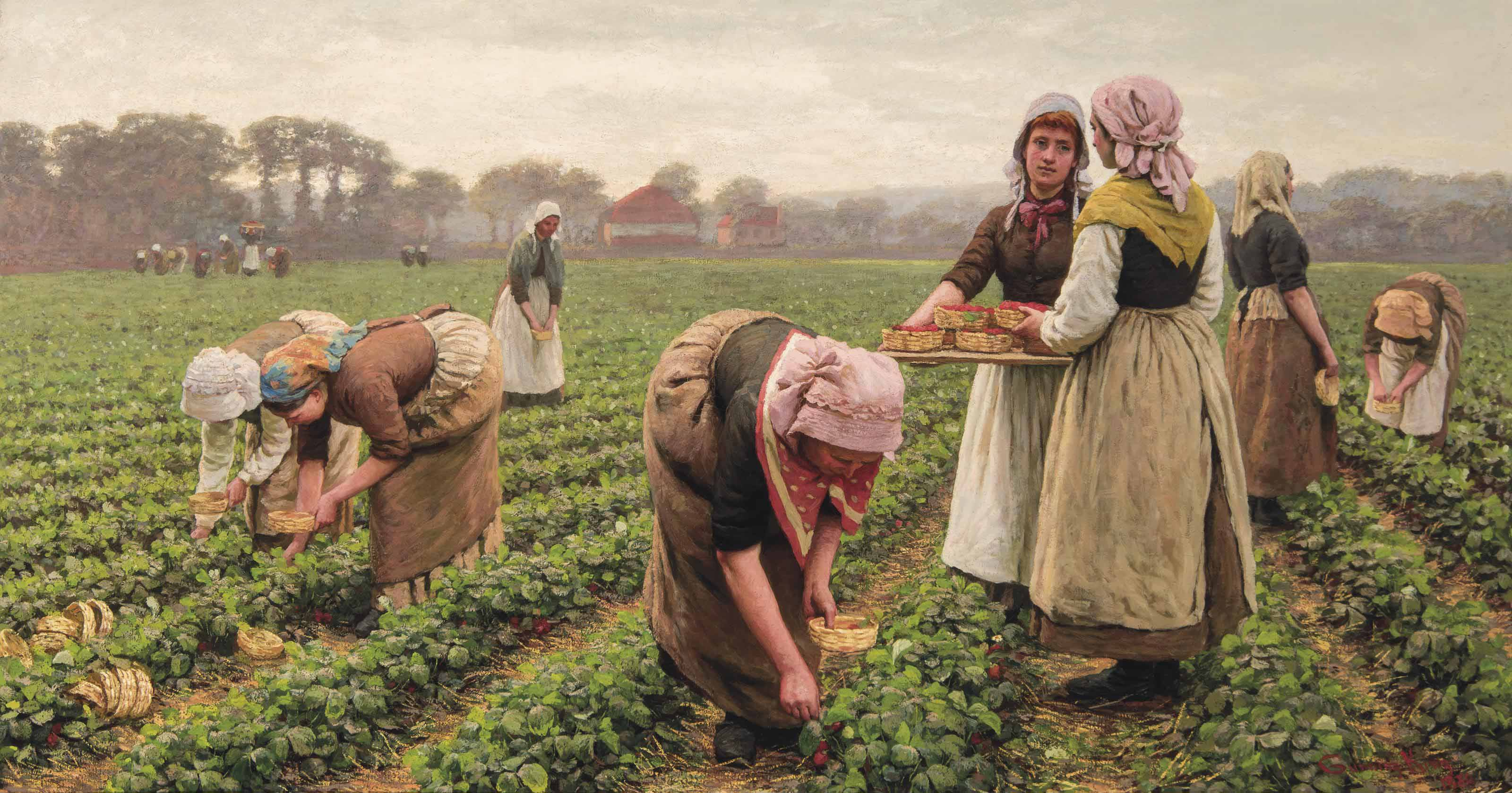
Women have historically represented a significant percentage of the workforce

- While it could vary widely by socioeconomic class, specific period and culture, and individual families and couples, the general idea that women in modern history up until the mid-20th century typically stayed home as housewives while men worked is a modern myth and a "traditional" ideal rather than a long-standing reality. Throughout history, women have consistently worked in agriculture, manufacturing, and family businesses, often working 12–15 hours a day.

=== North America ===
- The early settlers (commonly known as Pilgrims) of the Plymouth Colony in North America usually did not wear all black, and their capotains (hats) did not include buckles. Instead, their fashion was based on that of the late Elizabethan era. The traditional image was formed in the 19th century when buckles were a kind of emblem of quaintness. (The Puritans, who settled in the adjacent Massachusetts Bay Colony shortly after the Pilgrims arrived in Plymouth, did frequently wear all black.) Nor did most Pilgrims use blunderbusses, as they are often pictured.
- People accused of witchcraft were not burned at the stake during the Salem witch trials. Of the accused, nineteen people convicted of witchcraft were executed by hanging, at least five died in prison, and one man, Giles Corey, was pressed to death by stones while trying to extract a confession from him.
- George Washington did not have wooden teeth. His dentures were made of lead, gold, hippopotamus ivory, the teeth of various animals, including horse and donkey teeth, and human teeth, possibly bought from slaves or poor people. Because ivory teeth quickly became stained, they may have had the appearance of wood to observers.

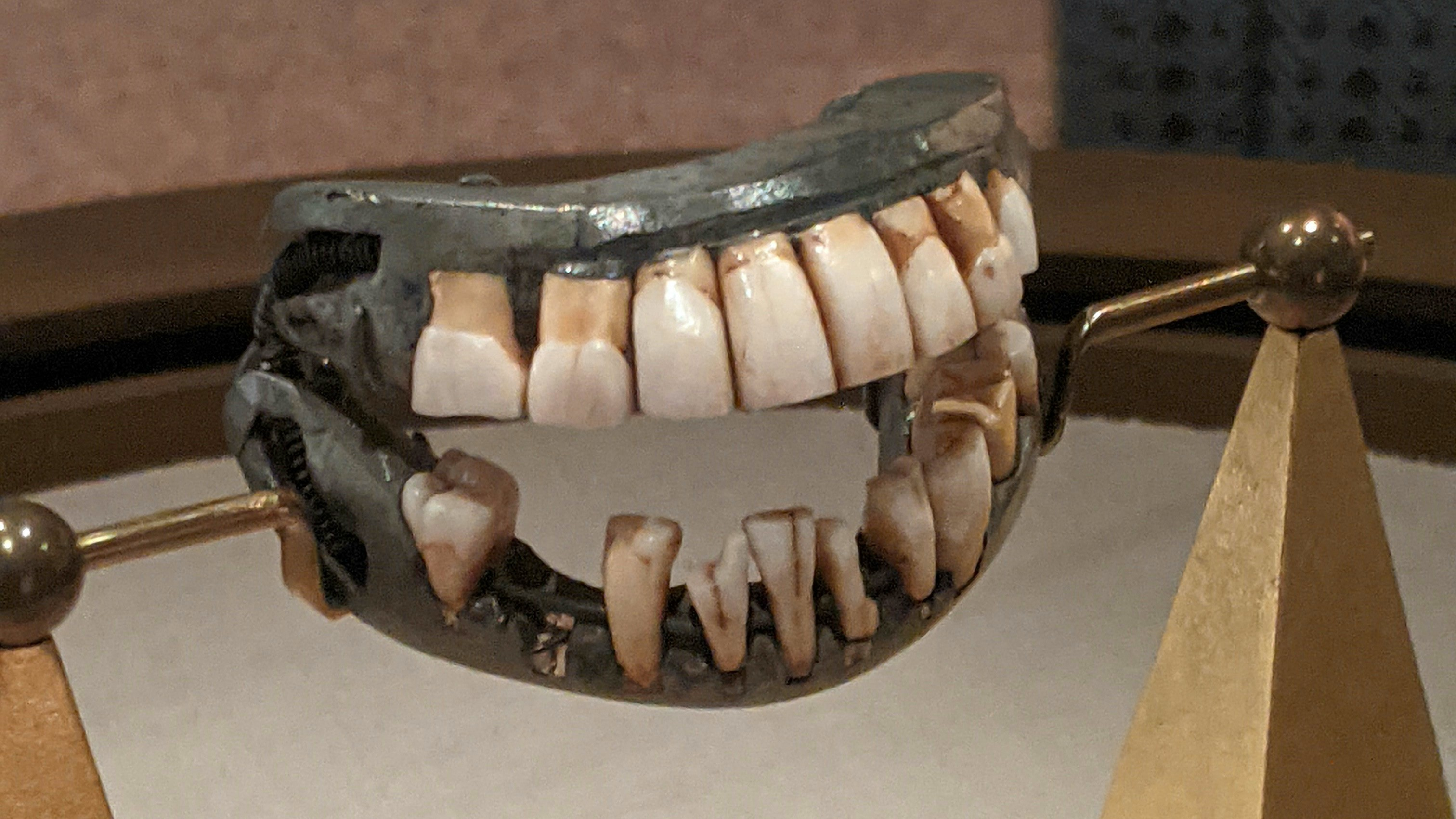
George Washington's dentures

- George Washington did not say "I cannot tell a lie" when being caught cutting down his father's cherry tree. Both the phrase and the tree were a fabricated anecdote created by one of Washington's biographers, Mason Locke Weems, to portray him as exceptionally honest.
- The signing of the United States Declaration of Independence did not occur on 4 July 1776. After the Second Continental Congress voted to declare independence on 2 July, the final language of the document was approved on 4 July, and it was printed and distributed on 4–5 July. However, the actual signing occurred on 2 August 1776.
- Benjamin Franklin did not propose that the wild turkey be used as the symbol for the United States instead of the bald eagle. While he did serve on a commission that tried to design a seal after the Declaration of Independence, his proposal was an image of Moses. His objections to the eagle as a national symbol and preference for the turkey were stated in a 1784 letter to his daughter in response to the Society of the Cincinnati's use of the former; he never expressed that sentiment publicly.
- There was never a bill to make German the official language of the United States that was defeated by one vote in the House of Representatives, nor has one been proposed at the state level. In 1794, a petition from a group of German immigrants was put aside on a procedural vote of 42 to 41, that would have had the government publish some laws in German. This was the basis of the Muhlenberg legend, named after the Speaker of the House at the time, Frederick Muhlenberg, who was of German descent and abstained from this vote.

=== Asia ===
- There is little to no evidence that ninjas were assassins and wore fully black costumes, as it is popularly believed and commonly portrayed in fiction. Instead, they were primarily spies and infiltrators and their costumes for combat when not disguised were typically dark brown, while during peacetime they wore dark indigo work clothes similar to those of farmers. These false stereotypes originate from Japanese theatre of the Edo period.

== Modern ==
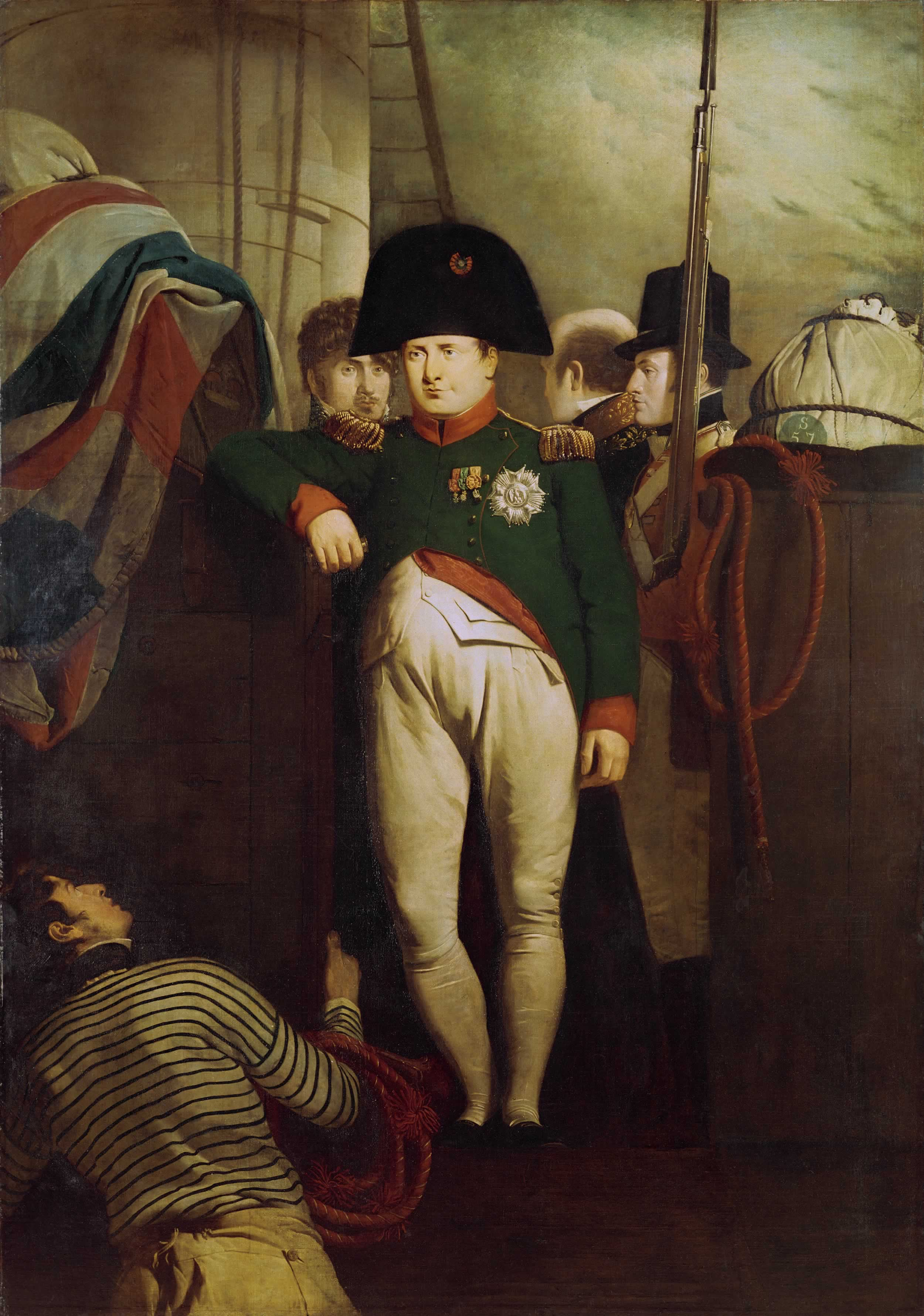
Napoleon was not especially short.

- Napoleon Bonaparte was not especially short for a Frenchman of his time. He was the height of an average French male in 1800, but short for an aristocrat or officer. After his death in 1821, the French emperor's height was recorded as 5 feet 2 inches in French feet, which in English measurements is 5 feet 7 inches (1.70 m).
- The nose of the Great Sphinx of Giza was not shot off by Napoleon's troops during the French campaign in Egypt (1798–1801); it has been missing since at least the 10th century.
- Cinco de Mayo is not Mexico's Independence Day, but the celebration of the Mexican Army's victory over the French in the Battle of Puebla on 5 May 1862. Mexico's Declaration of Independence from Spain in 1810 is celebrated on 16 September.
- Victorian-era doctors did not invent the vibrator to cure female "hysteria" by triggering orgasm.

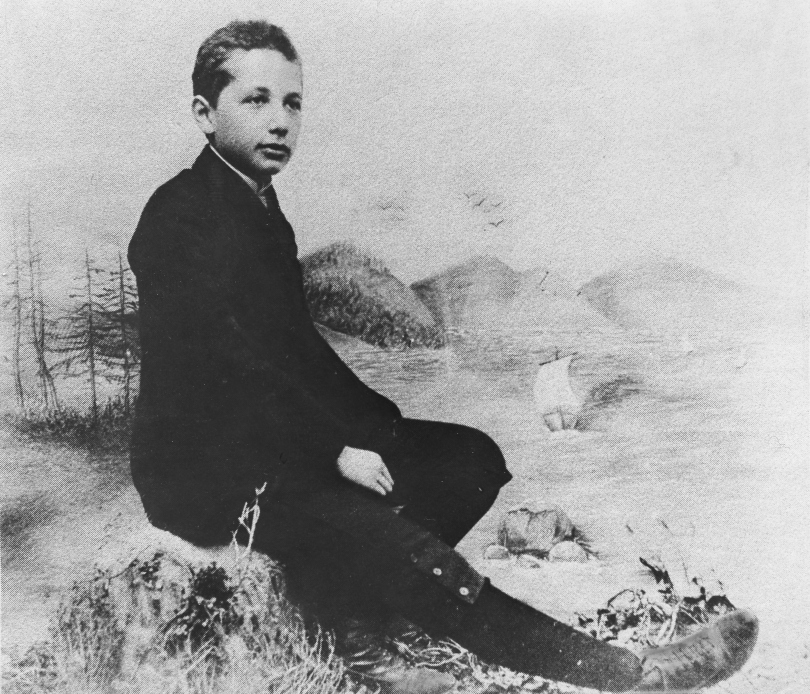
Albert Einstein, photographed at 14, did not fail mathematics at school.

- Albert Einstein did not fail mathematics classes in school. Einstein remarked, "I never failed in mathematics.... Before I was fifteen I had mastered differential and integral calculus." Einstein did, however, fail his first entrance exam into the Swiss Federal Polytechnic School (ETH) in 1895, when he was two years younger than his fellow students, but scored exceedingly well in the mathematics and science sections, and then passed on his second attempt. The misconception likely stems from different grading systems in Switzerland and Germany, where a 6 is the best grade in Switzerland, but the worst grade in Germany.
- Alfred Nobel did not omit mathematics in the Nobel Prize due to a rivalry with mathematician Gösta Mittag-Leffler, as there is little evidence the two ever met, nor was it because Nobel's spouse had an affair with a mathematician, as Nobel was never married. The more likely explanation is that Nobel believed mathematics was too theoretical to benefit humankind, as well as his personal lack of interest in the field. (See also: Nobel Prize controversies)
- Gavrilo Princip was not eating a sandwich just before he assassinated Archduke Franz Ferdinand. This myth likely originated from the 2001 novel Twelve Fingers, which presents a fictionalized version of the events of the assassination that includes the sandwich.
- Grigori Rasputin was not assassinated by being fed cyanide-laced cakes and wine, shot multiple times, and then thrown into the Little Nevka river when he survived the former two. A contemporary autopsy reported that he was just killed with gunshots. A sensationalized account from the memoirs of co-conspirator Prince Felix Yusupov is the only source of this story.
- The Italian dictator Benito Mussolini did not "make the trains run on time". Much of the repair work had been performed before he and the Fascist Party came to power in 1922. Moreover, the Italian railways' supposed adherence to timetables was more propaganda than reality.
- There is no evidence of Polish cavalry mounting a brave but futile charge against German tanks using lances and sabers during the German invasion of Poland in 1939. This story may have originated from German propaganda efforts following the charge at Krojanty.
- During the occupation of Denmark by the Nazis during World War II, King Christian X of Denmark did not thwart Nazi attempts to identify Jews by wearing a yellow star himself. Jews in Denmark were never forced to wear the Star of David. The Danish resistance did help most Jews flee the country before the end of the war.
- Kamikaze pilots were not sent on missions without enough fuel to return to base. Pilots were permitted to return without punishment in the event they failed to find their target or suffered from maintenance problems. Further, additional fuel served to create larger explosions on impact.
- Not all skinheads are white supremacists; many skinheads identify as left-wing or apolitical, and many oppose racism, such as the Skinheads Against Racial Prejudice. Originating from the 1960s British working class, many of its initial adherents were black and West Indian; it became associated with white supremacy in the 1970s as a result of far-right groups like the National Front recruiting from the subculture for grassroot support.
- Political terms left and right come from France, not the Bible. Social media posts suggest a Biblical quote (Ecclesiastes 10:2, for example) is the origin of the political terms left and right. This is false; historians and researchers say the distinction arose in the constituent assembly in France in 1789, when a seating plan placed conservatives and progressives on opposite sides.

=== United States ===
The flag that Betsy Ross purportedly designed

- Betsy Ross did not design or make the first official U.S. flag, despite it being widely known as the Betsy Ross flag. The claim was first made by her grandson a century later. Congressional records credit Francis Hopkinson with designing the flag.

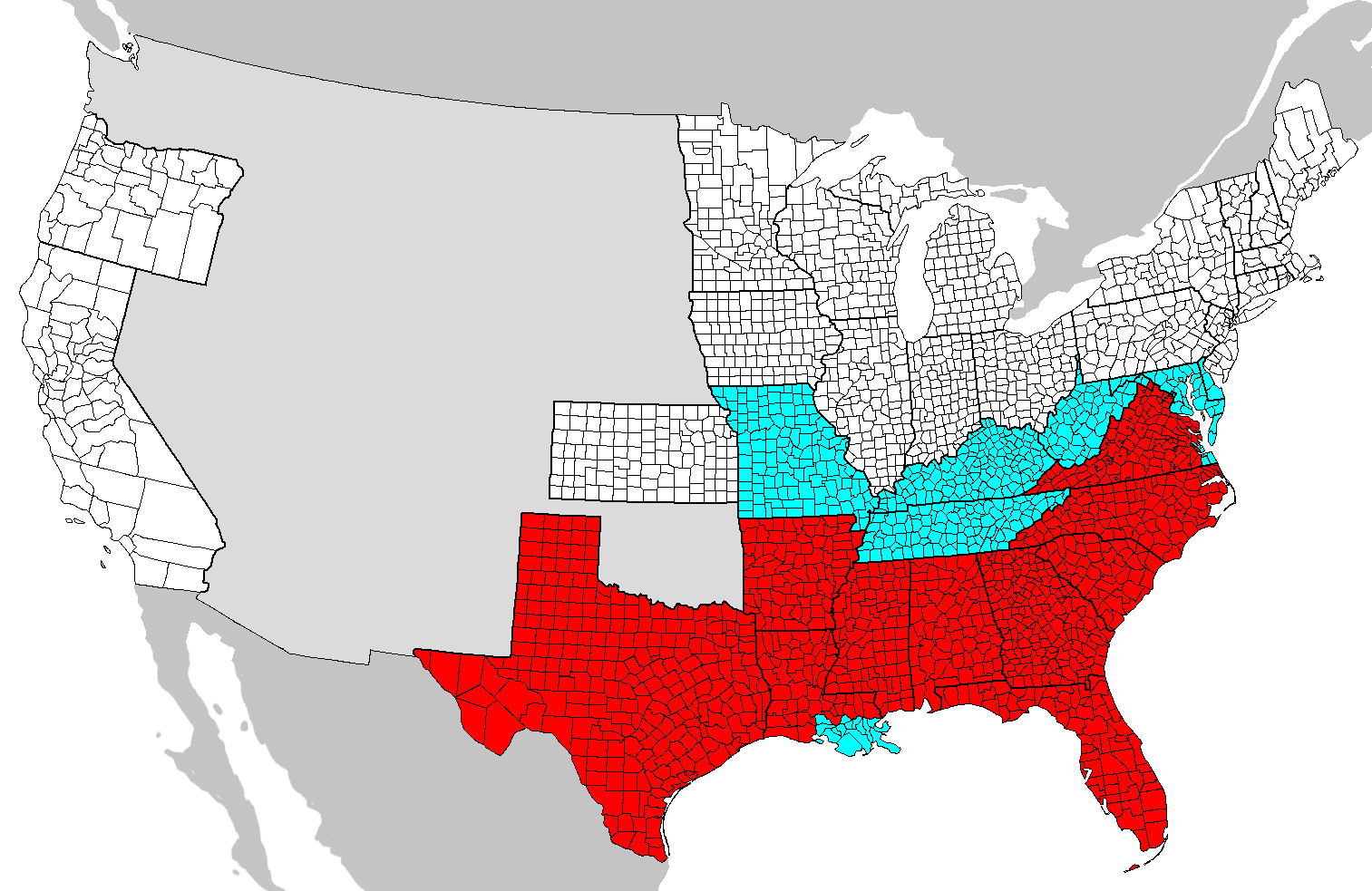
The Thirteenth Amendment abolished chattel slavery in the United States nationwide, not the Emancipation Proclamation (red areas only).

- Abraham Lincoln did not write his Gettysburg Address speech on the back of an envelope on his train ride to Gettysburg. The speech was substantially complete before Lincoln left Washington for Gettysburg.
- The Emancipation Proclamation did not free all slaves in the United States; the Proclamation only applied in the ten states that were still in rebellion in 1863, and thus did not cover the nearly five hundred thousand slaves in the slaveholding border states that had not seceded. (See also: Abolition of slavery timeline)
- Likewise, the June 19, 1865, order celebrated annually as "Juneteenth" only applied in Texas, not the United States at large. The Thirteenth Amendment, ratified and proclaimed in December 1865, was the article that banned slavery nationwide except as punishment for a crime.
- The Alaska Purchase was generally viewed as positive or neutral in the United States, both among the public and the press. The opponents of the purchase who characterized it as "Seward's Folly" (named for the Secretary of State who negotiated it) represented a minority.
- Cowboy hats were not initially popular in the Western American frontier, with derby or bowler hats being the typical headgear of choice. Heavy marketing of the Stetson "Boss of the Plains" model in the years following the American Civil War was the primary driving force behind the cowboy hat's popularity, with its characteristic dented top not becoming standard until near the end of the 19th century.
- The Great Chicago Fire of 1871 was not caused by Mrs. O'Leary's cow kicking over a lantern. A newspaper reporter later admitted to having invented the story to make colorful copy.
- There is no evidence that Frederic Remington, on assignment to Cuba in 1897, telegraphed William Randolph Hearst: "There will be no war. I wish to return," nor that Hearst responded: "Please remain. You furnish the pictures, and I'll furnish the war". The anecdote was originally included in a book by James Creelman and probably never happened.
- The electrocution of Topsy the Elephant was not an anti-alternating current demonstration organized by Thomas A. Edison during the war of the currents. Edison was never at Luna Park, and the electrocution of Topsy took place ten years after the war of currents. This myth may stem from the fact that the recording of the event was produced by the Edison film company.
- Mary Mallon, known as "Typhoid Mary", testified at her 1909 trial that she did not believe she was contagious while an asymptomatic carrier of the bacteria Salmonella typhi. She later infected many others, while using fake names and evading health authorities.
- Immigrants' last names were not Americanized (voluntarily, mistakenly, or otherwise) upon arrival at Ellis Island. Officials there kept no records other than checking ship manifests created at the point of origin, and there was simply no paperwork that would have let them recast surnames, let alone any law. At the time in New York, anyone could change the spelling of their name simply by using that new spelling. These names are often referred to as an "Ellis Island Special".
- Prohibition did not make drinking alcohol illegal in the United States. The Eighteenth Amendment and the subsequent Volstead Act prohibited the production, sale, and transport of "intoxicating liquors" within the United States, but their possession and consumption were never outlawed.
- Distraught stockbrokers did not jump to their deaths in large numbers after the Wall Street Crash of 1929. Although extensively reported by the news media, the phenomenon was limited in number and the overall suicide rate following the 1929 crash did not increase.
- There was no widespread outbreak of panic across the United States in response to Orson Welles' 1938 radio adaptation of H.G. Wells' The War of the Worlds. Only a very small share of the radio audience was listening to it, but newspapers, being eager to discredit radio as a competitor for advertising, played up isolated reports of incidents and increased emergency calls. Both Welles and CBS, which had initially reacted apologetically, later came to realize that the myth benefited them and actively embraced it in later years.
- U.S. Senator George Smathers never gave a speech to a less-educated audience describing his opponent, Claude Pepper, as an "extrovert" whose sister was a "thespian", in the apparent hope they would confuse them with similar-sounding words like "pervert" and "lesbian". Smathers offered US$10,000 to anyone who could prove he had made the speech; it was never claimed.
- Dwight D. Eisenhower did not order the construction of the Interstate Highway System for the sole purpose of evacuating cities in the event of nuclear warfare. While military motivations were present, the primary motivations were civilian.
- Rosa Parks was not sitting in the front ("white") section of the bus during the event that made her famous and incited the Montgomery bus boycott. Rather, she was sitting in the front of the unreserved section of the bus, where both white passengers and African Americans could sit in but with white passengers being prioritized, and rejected an order from the driver to vacate her seat in favor of a white passenger when the "white" section of the bus had become full.
- The African-American intellectual and activist W. E. B. Du Bois did not renounce his U.S. citizenship while living in Ghana shortly before his death. In early 1963, his membership in the Communist Party and support for the Soviet Union led the U.S. State Department to refuse to renew his passport while he was already in Ghana. After leaving the embassy, he stated his intention to renounce his citizenship in protest, but while he took Ghanaian citizenship, he never actually renounced his American citizenship.
- US President John F. Kennedy's words "Ich bin ein Berliner" are standard German for "I am a Berliner (citizen of Berlin)." It is not true that by using the indefinite article ein, he changed the meaning of the sentence from the intended "I am a citizen of Berlin" to "I am a Berliner", a Berliner being a type of German pastry, similar to a jelly doughnut, amusing Germans. Furthermore, the pastry, which is known by many names in Germany, was not then – nor is it now – commonly called "Berliner" in the Berlin area.
- When Kitty Genovese was murdered outside her apartment in 1964, there were not 38 neighbors standing idly by and watching who failed to call the police until after she was dead, as was initially reported to widespread public outrage that persisted for years and even became the basis of a theory in social psychology. In fact, witnesses only heard brief portions of the attack and did not realize what was occurring, and only six or seven actually saw anything. One witness, who had called the police, said when interviewed by officers at the scene, "I didn't want to get involved", an attitude later attributed to all the neighbors.

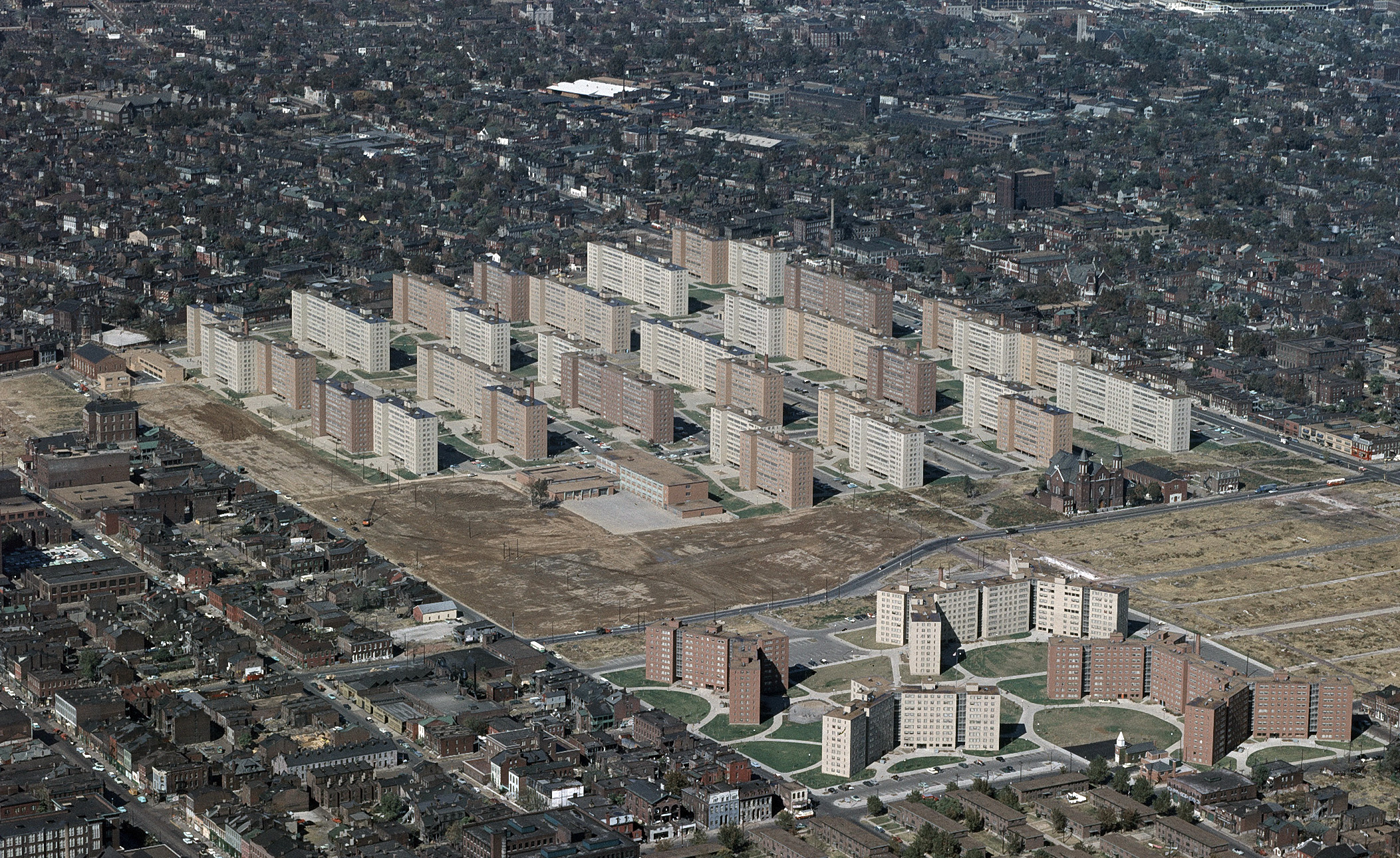
The Wendell O. Pruitt Homes and William Igoe Apartments complex

- While it was praised by one architectural magazine before it was built as "the best high apartment of the year", the Pruitt–Igoe housing project in St. Louis, Missouri never won any awards for its design. The architectural firm that designed the buildings did win an award for an earlier St. Louis project, which may have been confused with Pruitt–Igoe.
- There is little contemporary documentary evidence for the notion that US Vietnam veterans were spat upon by anti-war protesters upon return to the United States. This belief was detailed in some biographical accounts and was later popularized by films such as Rambo.
- Women did not burn their bras outside the Miss America contest in 1969 as a protest in support of women's liberation. They did symbolically throw bras in a trash can, along with other articles seen as emblematic of women's position in American society such as mops, make-up, and high-heeled shoes. The myth of bra burning came when a journalist hypothetically suggested that women may do so in the future, as men of the era burned their draft cards.
- The American space program in the 1960s never had a wide base of public support and did not unify the United States. Belief that the Apollo program was worth the time and money invested peaked at 51% for a few months after the 1969 Apollo 11 moon landing, and otherwise had fluctuated between 35–45% support.
- Despite popularizing the phrase "drinking the Kool-Aid", Kool-Aid was not used for the potassium cyanide-fruit punch mix ingested as part of the Jonestown massacre. A similar product, Flavor-Aid, was used.
