= Jón Rögnvaldsson =

Alleged Icelandic sorcerer

Jón Rögnvaldsson (died 1625) was an alleged Icelandic sorcerer.

The bailiff Magnus Björnsson had been educated in Copenhagen where he read about witch persecutions from an event in 1487. He had brought this book with him to Iceland. In 1625 he heard a rumour that ghosts had made a boy ill and killed several horses. He evidently made the assumption that this had been caused by unknown witches, who needed to be exposed. The sick boy pointed out Jon Rögnvaldsson. During the search of his house an arch of paper with Icelandic runes written on it was found. Jon admitted to having written them. Jon's brother, the poet Thorvald Rögnvaldsson, testified in his defense that although Jon might have attempted to use rune magic, so called Galdrar, he had neither the strength nor the intelligence to succeed. But Magnus Björnsson judged Jon as guilty of sorcery and sentenced him to death. He was one of the first people to be executed for sorcery in Iceland.

Iceland, which was under the jurisdiction of the union of Norway and Denmark, had kept the old pagan customs alive. Christianity was weak and magic was admired. The Protestant church and the authorities in Copenhagen strongly disapproved of this and in 1564 a new law about "decency" was issued from Copenhagen to the island. The priests in Iceland were ordered to trace down everything unchristian. The popular magician Jón lærði Guðmundsson, famous for making a Turkish pirate ship in search of slaves turn from the island, had been accused of sorcery by the authorities several times but been acquitted every time.

In 1630, the union Denmark-Norway's witch law from 1617 was proclaimed on Iceland. Between 1625 and 1686, Iceland was to see 120 witch trials. The majority of people accused of sorcery on Iceland were male; only ten women were accused, and of these, only one was burned alive. Women were normally drowned, while men were burned. In 1678, the widow Thuridur Olafsdottir and her son were burned at the stake accused of having made the wife of a priest sick by magic, after the son had claimed that his mother could walk on waterfalls by use of galdrar. The most famous Icelandic witch trial took place in 1656, when a man and his son were burned at the stake for sorcery after a conflict with a priest.

== See also ==
- Kirkjuból witch trial
