= Aleksander Heintalu =

Estonian non-fiction writer

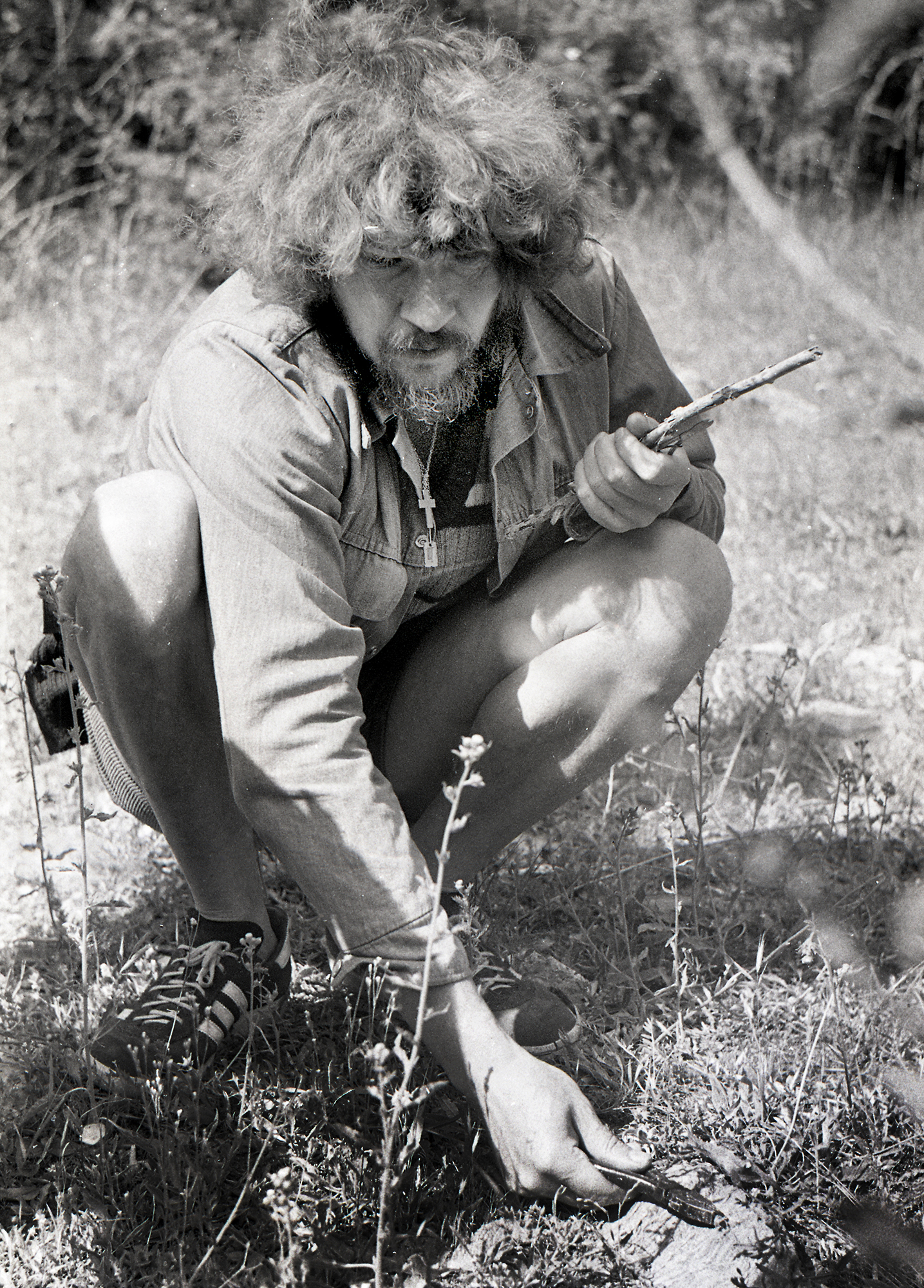
- Aleksander Heintalu in 1982
- Born: May 31, 1941; Tartu, Estonia
- Died: August 19, 2015 (aged 74); Estonia
- Other names: Vigala Sass, Aleksander Rassadkin
- Education: Estonian University of Life Sciences
- Occupations: Agriculturist, writer
- Known for: Alternative medicine, Estonian neopaganism

Aleksander Heintalu (also known as Vigala Sass; until 1974, Aleksander Rassadkin; 31 May 1941 – 19 August 2015) was an Estonian agriculturist, who, in addition to his botanical knowledge, spent time examining herbs in Siberia and the Far East.. He practiced herbalism and alternative medicine. He was also known for his participation in and popularization of Estonian neopaganism. He was born in Tartu. In 1981, he graduated from the Estonian University of Life Sciences, then known as the Estonian Agricultural Academy.

In May 1990, on the 350th anniversary of the death of the healer and accused witch Kongla Ann, a memorial stone was unveiled in Viru-Nigula. The ceremony was done to restore the spiritual dignity of the accused and to honor her as a symbol of dissenters who kept Estonian traditions alive. As a member of the native religion Maausk, Heintalu (known then by the name Vigala Sass) led a loits (a public incantation or spell) at the ceremony. Before Estonia gained independence, those practising their native religion openly were often doing so as a form of protest because of the enforced atheism and cultural leveling that occurred during the Soviet era.

== Works ==
- Kuldjuure (Rhodiola rosea L.) agrotehnika Eesti NSV-s [Agrotechnics of Golden Root (Rhodiola rosea L.) in the Estonian SSR] (1988)
- Minu raviraamat [My Book of Healing] (series, 1991–1993)
- Estide (tšuudide) hingestatud ilm (2001) [The Soulful World of the Ests (Chudes)]
- Sassi raviraam (2003) [Sass's Book of Healing]
- Taimeravi põhitõed (2005) [Fundamentals of Herbal Medicine]
- Estide (tšuudide) hingestatud ilm II (2007) [The Soulful World of the Ests (Chudes) II]

== See also ==
- Maausk
- Estonian native religion
- Estonian folklore
- Estonian independence movement
- Estonian neopaganism
- Estonian paganism
