= Margrét Þórðardóttir =

Icelandic woman accused of witchcraft

Margrét Þórðardóttir (c. 1614-after 1703), known in folklore under her sobriquet Galdra-Manga ('Sorcery-Manga'), was an Icelandic woman, known for being persecuted for witchcraft. She has been incorrectly referred to as one of only two women executed for sorcery in Iceland (alongside Thuridur Olafsdottir) and is the subject of folktales.

Margrét was likely the daughter of Þórður Guðbrandsson, one of the executed in the Trékyllisvík witch trial in 1654. She was persecuted for witchcraft because of her father, and famously fled from the court until she was finally apprehended and put on trial in 1662. She was acquitted. She married Tómas Þórðarson (d. after 1681) and was still alive at the time of the 1703 Census of Iceland.
