= Pada, Estonia =

Village in Lääne-Viru County, Estonia

Pada
- Village
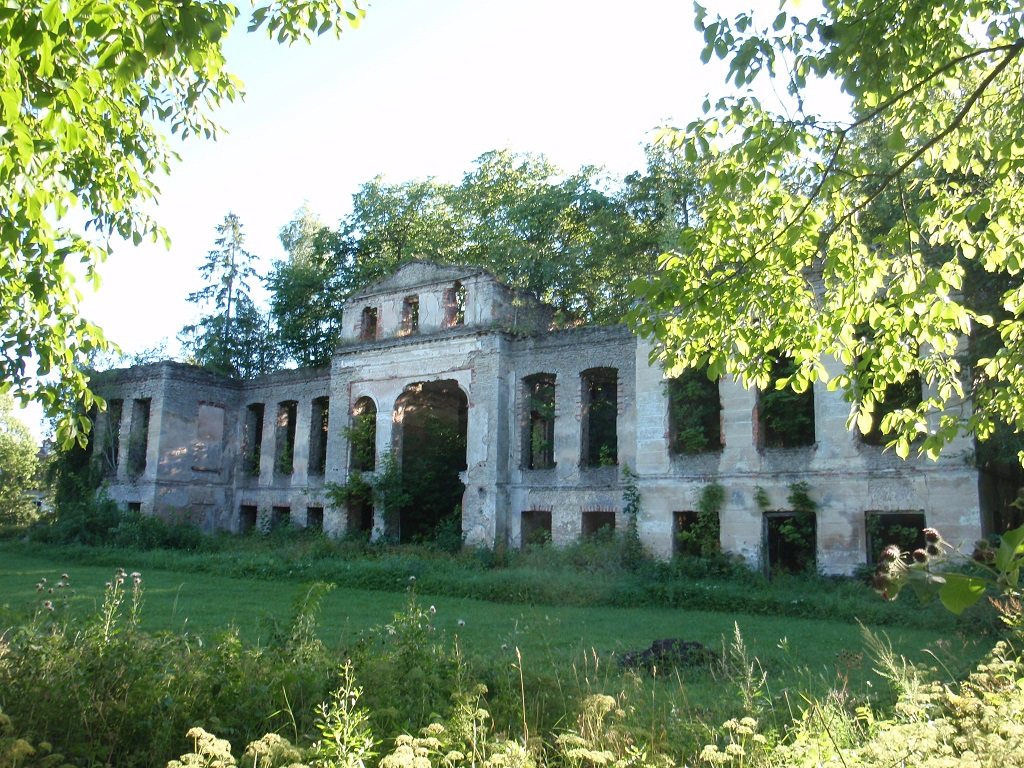
- Pada manor ruins

- Location in Estonia
- Coordinates: 59°25′39″N 26°42′34″E
- Country: Estonia
- County: Lääne-Viru County
- Municipality: Viru-Nigula Parish

Population (01.01.2010)
  - Total: 63

Pada is a village in Viru-Nigula Parish, Lääne-Viru County, in northeastern Estonia. It has a population of 63 (as of 1 January 2010). The village was first mentioned in the Danish Census Book in 1241. The Tallinn–Narva highway (E20) passes through Pada in the valley of Pada River.

== See also ==
- Kongla Ann, a resident of Pada who was burned for witchcraft
