= Witch trials in Latvia and Estonia =

Witch trials in Latvia and Estonia were mainly conducted by the Baltic German elite of clergy, nobility and burghers against the indigenous peasantry in order to persecute Paganism by use of Christian demonology and witchcraft ideology. In this aspect, they are similar to the Witch trials in Iceland. They are badly documented, as many would have been conducted by the private estate courts of the landlords, which did not preserve any court protocols.

== History ==
=== Background ===
The area of present-day Estonia and Latvia was occupied by the German Teutonic Order in the 13th century. The Teutonic Order Christianized the territory and introduced a new Christian law, the Livonian Law, based on the German Sachsenspiegel from 1225, which included death by burning at the stake for sorcery. It was followed by the Riga Synod in 1428, where all Christian priests were commanded to report anyone practicing or hiring anyone to practice Paganism or sorcery, so that they may be burned. As the documentation of the legal courts from the Middle Ages is mostly lacking, it is not known if these laws resulted in any executions.

The first confirmed witchcraft execution in Livonia took place on the estate Saku outside Reval in 1527, followed by the Põlula witch trials in 1542, and five women executed in the Juuru witch trials of 1588

It is not until the 17th century, however, that enough documentary material is preserved to allow for a more systematic investigation of Baltic witch trials. A turning point was the publication of the German witchcraft handbook Neun Außerlesen und Wolgegründete Hexen Predigt by the Superintendent of the Livonian church, Hermann Samson in Riga in 1625, which introduced the Western European Demonology and witchcraft ideology among the local elite, thus providing an ideological foundation for witchcraft persecution in Livonia. A few years later, in 1629, Livonia was acquired from Poland-Lithuania by the Swedish Empire, the former dominion of Estonia already having been conquered by Sweden in 1561.

A reason for the witchcraft persecutions in the region was that Christianity was weak. Christianity had been forced upon the indigenous population by the German Baltic elite, and Paganism was still widely popular and practiced in secrecy by the peasantry. This was resented by the German language clergy, nobility and merchant class, and witch trials were instrumental in the persecution of Paganism and efforts to ensure religious conformity and safeguard Christianity. In 1637, the Superintendent of the Livonian Church stated that the Consistory should persecute the widespread "Paganism, witchcraft and idolatry" still practiced by the peasantry and ordered the local vicars to report if the peasants still gathered in holy places in nature to worship Pagan gods and perform sacrifices. In 1667–68, the Church Commission performed an investigation in Southern Estonia and reported that in almost every parish, there were Pagans who gathered in holy Pagan places or houses and celebrated Pagan gods to whom they drank and performed rituals under the supervision of certain men and women who acted as Pagan priests and priestesses. Many peasants were hostile toward Christianity and refused to go to church. This Paganism was a cause of great dislike by the Christian German clergy and the German landlords, who referred to the Pagan priests and priestesses as wizards and witches and used the witch trials to exterminate Paganism and enforce Christianity upon the peasantry.

=== Witch trials ===
See also Werewolf witch trials

The population of Livonia did believe in sorcery as such, but seldom in witchcraft as it was defined in the modern Christian demonology of the time. People were normally accused by their neighbors for having caused harm on them, their animals or their farm by the use of enchanted food or drink. People in general does not appear to have believed in the Devil's Pact and neither the accusers, witnesses nor the accused normally mentioned Satan at all until they were interrogated by the authorities, who used torture to adjust the confessions of the accused witches to modern demonology and the Devil's Pact and Sabbath of Satan described in the witchcraft handbooks of the continent. While the belief in Satanic witchcraft was rare among the peasantry, however, the belief in werewolves were strong and accusations was directed toward people accused of having harmed others while in their wolfe-shape: these form of accusations were also transformed in to witch trials by the authorities, who adjusted the confessions of the accused to fit the modern Christian witchcraft ideology. Torture was commonplace in Baltic witch trials, as was the ordeal by water, and the method of execution was to be burned alive at the stake, only in rare cases commuted to being decapitated beforehand.

The name of the accused are seldom documented, but the majority appear to have been elderly people of the peasantry, often cunning folk or their relatives. Men appear to have been accused about as often as women and in some regions even more often: of the 206 accused in Estonia were the gender is known, 60% were men. The Baltic witch trials were normally against only one or at the most four people at the same time, and large trials, such as the Paide witch trials with nine accused in 1615, was rare.

A difficulty in the research of Baltic witch trials was that the peasantry was under the serfdom of the nobility and any crime committed by a peasant was thereby under the private jurisdiction of the local landlord, who could conduct a private trial on his or her estate. The German Baltic landlords seldom documented and preserved any protocol over the witch trials they conducted on their estates, and the result is that the majority of the Baltic witch trials are those conducted in the cities during the 17th-century.

Of those witch trials where documentation is preserved, 140 are known in Estonia between 1520 and 1725. Of those witchcraft executions where documentation is preserved, 65 were conducted between 1610 and 1650, of which 29 were women and 26 men.

=== The end ===
Torture was finally banned in Livonia in 1686 and in Estonia in 1699. The perhaps last executions for witchcraft were the three people executed in a witch trial in Dorpat in 1699, the last of whom were Tattra Santi Michel. A witch trial was conducted in Dorpat in 1723, resulting in a death sentence for Wilo Ado of Valguta in Ranno, but the sentence was transformed to a prison sentence.

In 1816, the farmer Jakob was whipped and four accomplices, among them "Anna wife of Vana-Harm" was reprimanded for having claimed to be able to trace thieves by use of sorcery.

== See also ==
- Witch trials in the early modern period
- Modern witch-hunts
