= Slaying of the Basques =

1615 massacre of Basque whalers in Iceland

The Slaying of the Basques (known historically as the Slaying of the Spaniards, and also known as the Basque Killings; Icelandic: Baskavígin [baskaˌvijɪn]) was the last documented massacre in Icelandic history. A party of Basque whalers went on a whaling expedition to Iceland and were killed after a conflict in 1615 with local people in the region of the Westfjords.

== Background ==
During the first half of the sixteenth century, Basque whalers set up the world's first large-scale whaling industry in Newfoundland. The center of this industry was some ten ports on the southern coast of Labrador. During the peak years of the 1560s and 1570s, the fleet comprised around 30 ships manned by up to 2,000 men, who killed approximately 400 whales each year. By the beginning of the seventeenth century, Basque whaling had reached Iceland.

== Massacre ==
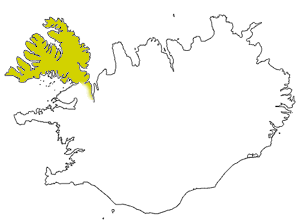
The Westfjords

The year 1615 was a difficult year in Iceland with ice up to shores until late summer and considerable loss of livestock. During mid-summer, three Basque whaling vessels came into Reykjarfjörður in Westfjords. The Icelanders and the Basques had a mutual agreement at the beginning as both parties benefited from the enterprise. When the ships were ready for departure in late September, a terrible gale arose and the ships were driven on the rocks and crushed. Most (approximately 80) of the crew members survived. Captains Pedro de Aguirre and Esteban de Telleria wintered at Vatneyri, Patreksfjörður and left for home the next year. The crew of Captain Martín de Villafranca's ship split into two groups; one entered Ísafjarðardjúp while the other went to Bolungarvík and later to Þingeyri.

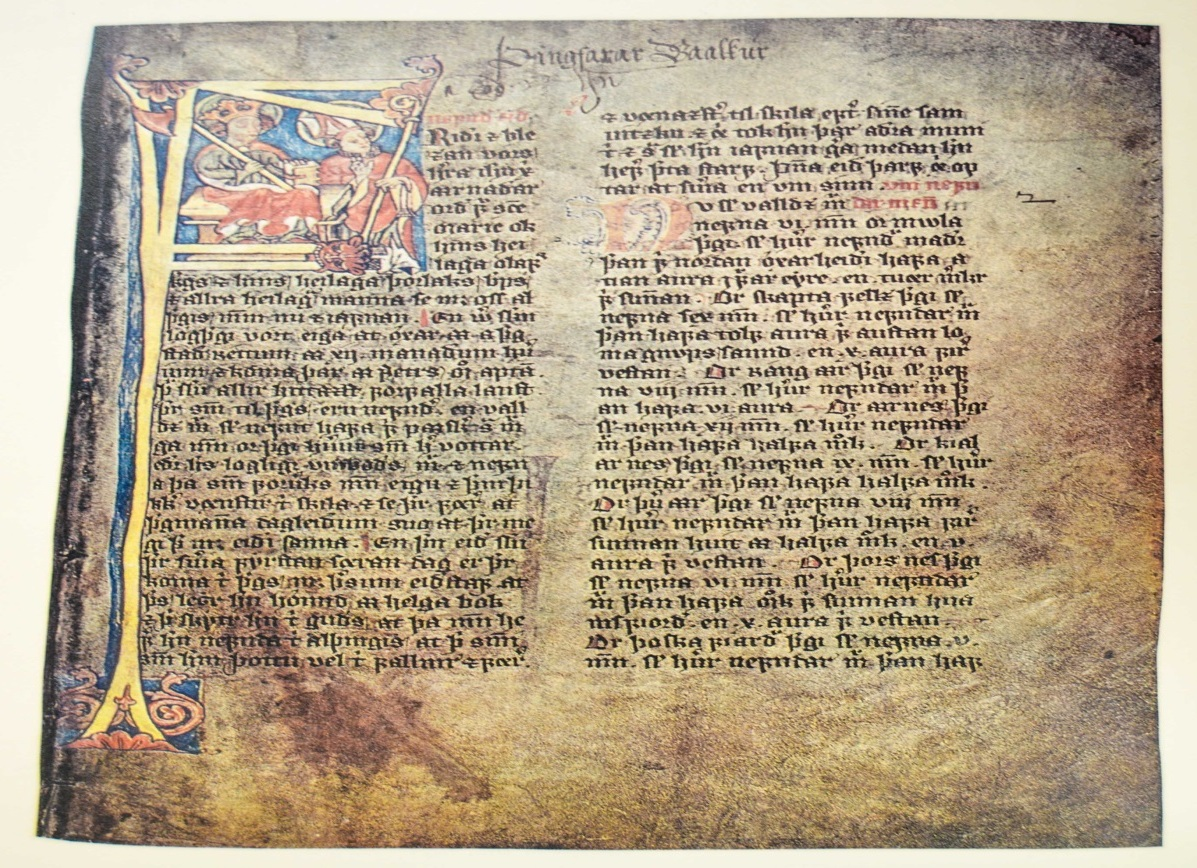
Jónsbók, MS AM 351 Fol., Skálholtsbók eldri.

The first conflict began when one group entered the empty house of a merchant of Þingeyri and stole some dried fish. As retaliation, on the night of 5 October, a group of Icelanders entered the hut where the Basques were sleeping and killed 14 of them. Only one young man called García escaped. The bodies were mutilated and sunken into water. Jón Guðmundsson the Learned wrote about the deaths "dishonored and sunken into sea, as if they were the worst pagans and not innocent Christians". Three days after the first slaying, Ari Magnússon summoned a council at Súðavík and twelve judges agreed to declare all the Basques as outlaws.

On 13 October, 18 more Basque were killed at Æðey and Sandeyri in Ísafjarðardjúp, while they were fishing, by troops commanded by Ari Magnússon. According to Jón Guðmundsson, the bodies were stabbed in the eyes, ears, and noses and had their genitals mutilated. The captain, Martín de Villafranca of San Sebastián, whose father and grandfather had both been involved with Terra Nova whaling, was injured in the shoulder and chest with an axe but managed to escape into the sea. However, he was stoned in the water and dragged to the shore where he was tortured to death.

Two verdicts were instigated by Sheriff Ari Magnússon of Ögur, Ísafjarðardjúp, in October 1615 and January 1616. The Basques were considered criminals after their ships were wrecked, and in accordance with the Icelandic law book of 1281, it was decided that the only right thing to do was to kill as many of them as possible. An estimated 32 Basques were killed.

== Aftermath ==
Jón Guðmundsson the Learned (1574–1658) wrote a critical account condemning the decision of the local sheriff to order the killings: A True Account of Spanish Men's Shipwrecks and Slayings. Jón says that they were unjustly killed; not wishing to take part in an attack on them, he fled south to Snæfellsnes.

On 22 April 2015, a descendant of one of the victims, Xabier Irujo, set up a stele in Hólmavík in memory of the massacre, along with Magnús Rafnsson, whose ancestor was a perpetrator. The opening ceremony was attended by Westfjords district commissioner Jónas Guðmundsson and Martín Garitano, then governor of the Gipuzkoa province in the Basque Country, Spain. At the occasion, Jónas formally revoked Ari Magnússon's 1615 decree.

== See also ==
- History of Basque whaling in Iceland
- History of Iceland
- Timeline of Icelandic history

== External links and sources ==
- Slaying of Spaniards
- Whaling in Iceland history
- Eddurit Jóns Guðmundssonar lærða
- 1615.info
