= Antti Lieroinen =

Finnish cunning man (d. 1643)

Antti Lieroinen (died 1643) was a Finnish cunning man who was executed for witchcraft. He is one of the more well-known victims of the witch trials in Finland, among whom male folk magicians were the most common victims.

Lieroinen was famous in contemporary Finland as a professional wizard long before his trial, particularly for his alleged ability to find stolen objects. He was also accused of having used his alleged powers to threaten people who wronged him.

He was put on trial in Åbo, charged for having committed the murder of a man and adultery after having seduced a married woman by the use of witchcraft. He was judged guilty and sentenced to decapitation.

As one of the many famous cunning men of Finland, he was the subject of folk legend long after his death. He is the subject of a play, a poem and an opera.
