= Sveinn Arnason =

Icelandic man executed for witchcraft (died 1683)

Sveinn Arnason (died 1683) was an Icelandic man who was executed for witchcraft. He was the last person executed for witchcraft in Iceland.

Between 1604 and 1720, there were 120 witch trials in Iceland, 22 of which resulted in executions (the last of which took place in 1683).

Sveinn Arnason was charged with causing the illness of the dean Sigurdur Jonsson's wife. He was executed by burning at the stake. He was the last person executed for sorcery in Iceland. While Klemus Bjarnason was condemned to death for sorcery in 1692, his execution never took place.
