= Jón lærði Guðmundsson =

Medieval Icelandic scholar, poet, and alleged sorcerer

Jón lærði Guðmundsson (Icelandic pronunciation: [ˈjouːn ˈlairðɪ ˈkvʏðmʏntsɔn]; 1574–1658) was an Icelandic autodidact, poet, and alleged sorcerer.

He is considered a pioneer of Icelandic literary history, because he was the first to write a description of Icelandic nature and a critical account of a contemporary event, in Icelandic. His poetry gives insight into contemporary Icelandic folklore.

Guðmundsson, who lived in Strandir, was considered a great master of magic in 17th century Iceland. He was said to have turned around the Turkish slave ships from the coasts of Iceland more than once, an achievement which gave him widespread fame, and was described in popular prints. He was also said to have killed two ghosts between 1611-1612 with two of his poems: "Fjandafæla" and "Snjáfjallavísum". He had to leave his home region and was tried for sorcery several times during the 1630s, but managed to avoid the death penalty every time.

Guðmundsson wrote an unbiased report of the Slaying of the Spaniards and as a result was declared an outlaw in his own country.

== See also ==
- Witch trials in Iceland
