= Klemus Bjarnason =

Last person condemned for witchcraft in Iceland

Klemus Bjarnason (died 1692) was the last person to have been condemned to death for witchcraft on Iceland.

He was sentenced to death for sorcery in 1690. However, because of the law reform of 1686, which stipulated that all death sentences for witchcraft were to be confirmed by the high court of Copenhagen in Denmark, he was transferred there, where he died without the sentence being performed. Thus, he was in fact not the last person to be executed for sorcery on Iceland: that was instead Sveinn Arnason in 1683.
