= Witch trials in Finland =

The Witch trials in Finland were conducted in connection to Sweden (Finland then being a part of Sweden) and were relatively few with the exception of the 1660s and 1670s, when a big witch hunt affected both Finland and Sweden. Finland differed from most parts of Europe (except for Carinthia and Salzburg regions of Austria, Normandy in France, and Russia where too the majority of victims were male) were in that an uncommonly large part of the accused were men, which it had in common with the witch trials in Iceland. Most of the people accused in Finland were men, so called "wise men" hired to perform magic by people. From 1674 to 1678, a real witch hysteria broke out in Ostrobothnia, during which twenty women and two men were executed.

== History ==
Much material is missing from the documentation of the local courts as well as from Turku, and the numbers for witch trials are therefore unknown. Preserved documentation states that 710 witch trials took place in Finland between 1520 and 1699, resulting in 115 death sentences.

During this period, Finland was a part of Sweden and under Swedish law. Sorcery was criminalized in Sweden–Finland in the County Law of 1350, which stated death penalty for sorcery only if it had been combined with murder (maleficium), and until the mid 17th century, the sorcery cases were only one or two annually and very rarely resulted in a death penalty. During the 17th-century, however, the interpretation of the law became more severe under the influence of Biblical law, and the definition of sorcery as witchcraft and a Pact with Satan became more common.

=== The witch trials ===
In contrast to most other European countries except Iceland, nearly half of those executed for sorcery in Finland were male: of 641 people accused for sorcery in Finland, 325 were women, and of the 277 executed for witchcraft, 133 were men. A reason for this was that in Finland, the traditional profession of a folk healer or cunning folk and the practice of magic were attributed more of often to men than to women, and that this category was the most common target of the witch trials. The typical Finnish witch trial was that of a well known cunning man accused by a private person of having harmed livestock or food by use of magic.

The first person executed for sorcery in Finland was probably Anna Olavintytär in 1526. Witch trials were not unusual in 17th century Finland, but they very seldom led to a death sentence, and sorcery was not, by people in general, associated with the Devil. Many of the people accused in Finland were men, so called "wise men" hired to perform magic by people.

The largest witch trials in Finland were the Kastelholm witch trials of Åland in the 1660s, and those in Ostrobothnia in 1674–1678, when between 157 and 200 people were charged, of which at least 41 were executed. This witch hunt was heavily influenced by the witch hunt conducted in Sweden at the time and differed from ordinary Finnish witch trials as they involved the Pact with Satan, the Witches' Sabbath and the child witnesses who claimed to have been abducted by the witches, and the majority of executed was female, none of which was otherwise common in Finland.

=== Discontinuation ===
Similarly to Sweden, persecutions and death sentences for witchcraft next to died out after the big witch hunt of the 1670s. While the accusations and the witch trials as such were common in Finland also after this—22 people were in fact charged in 1693–1697—the legal courts were unwilling to issue a death sentence for sorcery after 1678 and a confession of sorcery was often interpreted as a sign of insanity.

The last person executed for sorcery in Finland was probably a man, Erkki Antinpoika, in 1689. The last Finnish witch trial took place in Turku, when the merchant's daughter Beata Pintarintytär was accused of evil magic by twenty witnesses and sentenced to death after a body search that revealed a "bag" on her body that was considered proof; the execution was repealed to prison by the Court of Appeal of Turku, and she was released from prison in 1701.

== See also ==
- Witch trials in the early modern period
