= Beata Persdotter =

Beata Persdotter also known as Beata Pietarintytär and Beata Pitarintytär (d. after 1701) was a Finnish merchant daughter from Pedersöre in Ostrobothnia. She was the last person in Finland to be sentenced to death for sorcery, though the sentence was never carried out.

She was convicted against her denial in 1689 of having caused sickness on several people in Jakobstad by use black magic, after twenty witnesses and a body search which revealed "Devil's mark" on her body. She was convicted to death, and thus became the last person to be sentenced to death for sorcery in Finland. Her verdict was however transformed to imprisonment by the high court. She was released in 1701.
