= Criticism of space exploration =

Criticism of space exploration ranges from simple opposition to the cost and perceived benefit of crewed space flight to philosophical or political critique.

== History ==
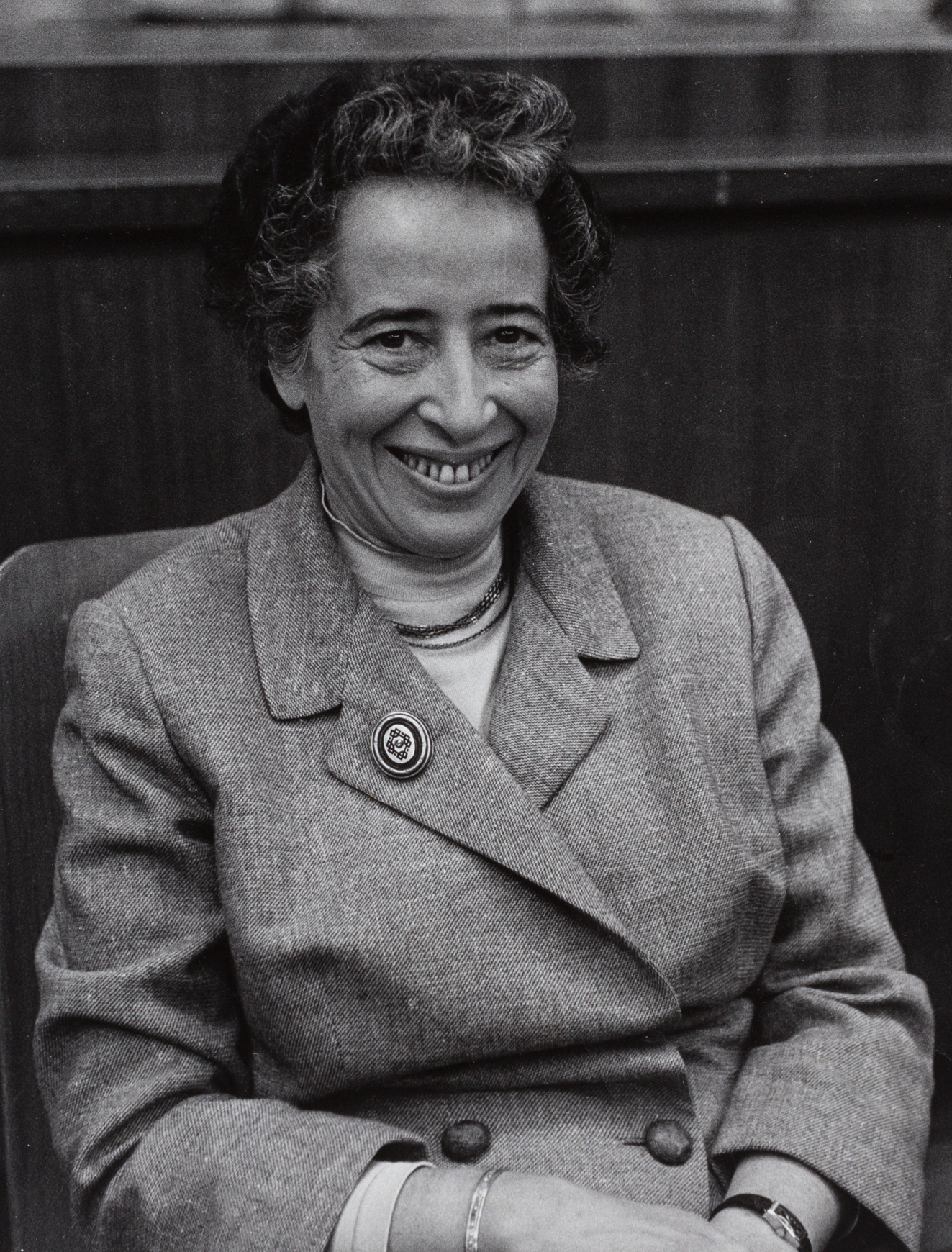
Hannah Arendt (pictured) argued against space exploration in the early stages of the Apollo program.

=== Apollo missions ===
In 1963, years before the 1969 Apollo 11 Moon landing, German-American critical theorist Hannah Arendt argued:

The conquest of space and the science that made it possible have come perilously close to this point. If they ever should reach it in earnest, the stature of man would not simply be lowered by all standards we know of but have been destroyed.

Throughout the 1960s, Students for a Democratic Society organized anti-NASA protests on college campuses. Sit-ins occurred at Columbia University's Pupin Physics Laboratories and MIT's Instrumentation Laboratory, as both conducted NASA research which was implemented by the United States military in Vietnam. In July 1969, civil rights leader Ralph Abernathy organized a protest at Cape Canaveral (then Cape Kennedy) to oppose the "inhuman priority" of space exploration over tackling poverty and racism. When addressing a white suburban audience filled with space and electronic experts, Unitarian Church Rev. David Eaton, said that "[t]he $23 billion we've spent going to the Moon has stolen money the black man needs for job retraining and schools."

== Contemporary arguments ==
=== Climate change ===
Amitai Etzioni wrote in 2018 that space colonization "brings with it an unavoidable subtext of despair", distracting from efforts to halt anthropogenic climate change, arguing that "any serious Mars endeavor will inevitably cut into the drive to save Mother Earth". Some studies suggest that the projected increase in space travel will damage the ozone layer. A single rocket launch produces 300 tonnes of carbon dioxide, staying longer in the upper atmosphere than emissions caused by airplanes or jets. Thomas Fink, however, argues the long-term benefits of space science offset the ecological risks.

=== Wastefulness ===
Arthur M. Schlesinger Jr. condemned space exploration, labeling it as wasteful. In the lead up to the Apollo program, Congressmen voiced doubts about the costliness of the missions. In 1977, Governor of California Jerry Brown was criticized for prioritizing space programs over addressing social issues.

== Political ==
Alexis C. Madrigal, writing in the Los Angeles Sentinel in 2012, said that

It would appear that the fathers of our nation would allow a few thousand hungry people to die for the lack of a few thousand dollars while they would contaminate the moon and its sterility for the sake of 'progress' and spend billions of dollars in the process, while people are hungry, ill-clothed, poorly educated (if at all).

Haris Durrani, writing in The Nation, argued in 2019 that "[s]paceflight almost invariably involves activities that directly subjugate marginalized peoples". Mark R. Royce, writing for Providence magazine, argued in 2020 that rather than being a non-partisan, inoffensive, and humanistic endeavor, space exploration is "largely irrational, originating at the intersection of the early Cold War arms race, the mass hysteria of the Red Scare, and the utopian worship of technical progress that characterized the mid-twentieth century." Gabrielle Cornish argued in 2019 that the moon landing was "at its core, a territorial conquest" in the context of the Cold War.

=== Linguistic ===
Several critics have likened space exploration to settler-colonialism and imperialism, with critics such as Deondre Smiles arguing that the exploration of space could lead to further colonization on Earth, pointing to the controversial construction of observatories in Mauna Kea. Sociologist Zuleyka Zevallos at Swinburne University has criticized the language used within and around space science, writing that "there is no democratic way to colonize other lands" and that "It is about profit, and profit always marginalizes minorities". In contrast, Robert Zubrin of the Mars Society responds that it is different from comparing the history of colonialism on Earth with the establishment of colonies on Mars.

== From within astrophysics ==
Fulbright scholar and Mars colonization advocate Zahaan Bharmal outlined three hypothetical arguments against human colonization of Mars: (1) that humans will contaminate Mars, (2) that robots have inherent advantages over humans in space exploration, and (3) that issues like climate change, overpopulation, and nuclear war should be prioritized over colonization. While broadly supportive of Mars colonization, Bharmal argues that humans "are perhaps not ready to go to Mars."

== Public opinion ==
Contrary to the common misconception that the American space program in the 1970s had a wide base of support, unifying America, belief that the Apollo program was worth the time and money invested peaked at 55% for a few months after the 1969 Moon landing, and was otherwise fluctuating between 35 and 45%.

== See also ==
- Criticism of science
