= Jón Magnússon (author) =

Jón Magnússon (c. 1610 – 1696) was an Icelandic Lutheran pastor and author of the Píslarsaga (Passion Saga or Story of My Sufferings), which recounts the physical and mental torments he believed he had suffered as a result of witchcraft.

== Early life ==
Jón Magnússon was born in northern Iceland as one of nine children. He lost his mother at an early age but came under the protection of the Bishop of Skálholt, who ensured he had the grammar school education which allowed him to become a pastor. After eight years at Ögur, in 1644 Jón Magnússon became the pastor of the village of Eyri, where he helped restore the dilapidated church.

== The events behind the Píslarsaga and the Kírkjuból Affair ==
All passed peacefully until 1655, when Jón Magnússon was involved in a dispute with two of his parishioners, a father and son both called Jón Jónsson. The younger Jón Jónsson had asked for the hand of Jón Magnússon's stepdaughter, Rannveig, in marriage but the pastor refused. That autumn, Jón Magnússon suddenly fell ill. Although he had already undergone a similar breakdown in his health in 1627, he ascribed this latest attack to witchcraft and he believed the culprits were the two Jón Jónssons. The first part of the Píslarsaga recounts his physical sufferings and his "demonic" visions, as well as his efforts to bring the "sorcerers" to justice. The legal authorities were initially reluctant to take action, but in March, 1656, the two Jón Jónssons were arrested. They confessed to dabbling with popular magic spells but not to being in league with the Devil, as Jón Magnússon had alleged. They were condemned and burned at the stake on April 10, 1656.

Nevertheless, Jón Magnússon's illness continued even after the Jón Jónssons had been executed. At first, he believed it was because their bodies had not been burned thoroughly, but when this too was done he gained only a brief respite before the torments began again. Jón Magnússon believed that there was another witch involved and his attention turned to Þuríður Jónsdóttir, the daughter of the elder Jón Jónsson. This time the authorities proved less responsive to his pleas. Þuríður fled from the district and found support with a leading churchman and his wife. The second part of the Píslarsaga is an account of Jón Magnússon's further torments and his attacks on the authorities he believed were allowing witchcraft to run rife in Iceland. At the Thingvellir (parliament) held in the summer of 1658, Þuríður Jónsdóttir was completely acquitted of all charges against her. Her beauty and intelligence made a strong impression and she was able to call on several witnesses to testify in her favour, whereas Jón Magnússon could only produce one, a "wandering prophet" called Erlendur Ormsson. Although defeated, Jón Magnússon continued his campaign, which included writing the Píslarsaga by way of justifying his actions. In 1660, Þuríður Jónsdóttir brought her own suit against him for persecution. After that, nothing is known for sure of the case, but it has been surmised that the two came to a private understanding and the matter was quietly dropped. Jón Magnússon continued to live an active life as pastor of Eyri until his retirement in 1689.

== Background: witch trials in 17th century Iceland ==
Execution for witchcraft was extremely rare in Iceland. The first burning at the stake took place only in 1625 and remained an isolated example until the 1650s. Thereafter, between 1654 and 1683, 20 people were burned for witchcraft, 19 men and one woman. These executions took place in the north and north-west of Iceland; elsewhere, there were accusations of witchcraft but ultimately nobody was condemned for it. The main reason for the upsurge in witch-burnings in this particular area has been ascribed to the influence of the prefect Þorleifur Kortsson, who had spent his early years abroad in Hamburg, during a time when there was an intense fear of witches in the city. Þorleifur Kortsson had been instrumental in the burning of three alleged sorcerers at Trékyllisvík in 1654. It is against this background that Jón Magnússon's accusations against Jón Jónsson and his children should be seen. In 1627, Jón Magnússon had not regarded his attack of illness as the result of magical influences, but in 1655 - a year after the burnings at Trékyllisvík - he ascribed his latest sufferings to witchcraft.

== The Píslarsaga in Icelandic literature ==
The Píslarsaga was composed in 1658–1659. It survives in a single manuscript dating to the 18th century and was first published in Copenhagen in 1914. The book is regarded as one of the outstanding examples of Icelandic literature of its era and is written in a highly ornate, Baroque style.

== In popular culture ==
Jón Magnússon's account of the witch trials inspired Witchcraft (Myrkrahöfðinginn), a 1999 Icelandic film directed by Hrafn Gunnlaugsson. The film draws loosely on the events described in his Píslarsaga, taking considerable liberties with the historical record.

== Sources ==
- And Though This World With Devils Filled: A Story Of Sufferings (American University Studies Series VII, Theology and Religion) translated by Michael Fell (Peter Lang Publishing, 2007)
- L'histoire des mes souffrances (French translation of the Píslarsaga with an introduction by Einar Már Jónsson, Les Belles Letters, 2004)
- Zarrillo, Dominick The Icelandic Witch Craze of the Seventeenth Century. In Academia.edu., from 2018 https://www.academia.edu/36665790/The_Icelandic_Witch_Craze_of_the_Seventeenth_Century
- Magnússon, Jón. Píslarsaga síra Jóns Magnússonar. Edited by Sigurður Nordal. Reykjavík: Almenna Bókafélagið, 1967
