= Kirkjuból witch trial =

1656 event in Iceland

The Kirkjuból witch trial was a witch trial that took place in Kirkjuból in 1656, in what is today Ísafjörður, in Iceland. It is the most famous witch trial in Iceland.

== Witch trial ==
The plaintiff in the trial was pastor Jón Magnússon, who had been suffering poor health since 1654. He contended that his illness, as well as what he described as demonic disturbances in his household and in the surrounding district, were brought on by sorcery practiced by two members of his own congregation, who also sang in the choir, a father and son both named Jón Jónsson. The elder Jón confessed to owning a book about magic and that he had used it against Jón Magnússon. The son also confessed to having made the pastor ill and of having used magical signs and farting runes (Fretrúnir) against a girl. The curse of farting was intended to be relentless; to not only humiliate the victim, but also to bring about chronic abdominal discomfort and weakness.

Both father and son were found guilty of sorcery and were executed by burning at the stake. After they were executed, the priest was awarded all their material holdings. Claiming that the disturbances and sicknesses did not cease, he then accused a Thuridur (Þuríður) Jónsdóttir, the daughter/sister of the Jónssons, of witchcraft. The case was brought to Þingvellir, was dismissed and the woman let free. She later countersued for wrongful persecution and was vindicated. She was awarded the pastor's belongings as compensation. In Iceland, magic was often practiced and not necessarily associated with the Devil, but the religious and secular authorities, influenced directly or indirectly by Denmark-Norway and the Holy Roman Empire, had a different view on the subject.

== In fiction ==
The trial and the writings of Jón Magnússon inspired Witchcraft (Myrkrahöfðinginn), a 1999 Icelandic film directed by Hrafn Gunnlaugsson. The film draws loosely on the historical events and Magnússon's 17th-century account, Píslarsaga séra Jóns Magnússonar (The Story of the Sufferings of Jón Magnússon), but departs considerably from the original court records.
