= Names of Iceland =

Numerous names for the country Iceland

There are numerous different names for Iceland, which have over the years appeared in poetry or literature.

== In Icelandic ==
Many names have been used to refer to Iceland in the Icelandic language. These names include colloquial, formal, and poetic forms:

- Eylenda [ˈeiːˌlɛnta], fem. – island
  Stephan G. Stephansson
  Fjarst í eilífðar útsæ
  vakir eylendan þín.
  Far in the eternal yonder sea
  your island wakes.
- Fjalladrottning [ˈfjatlaˌtrɔhtniŋk], fem. – queen of the mountain
- Fjallkonan [ˈfjatl̥ˌkɔːnan], fem. with definite article—lady of the mountain
- Frón Icelandic pronunciation: [ˈfrouːn], neu. – old Norse word for land
  Heima á Fróni.
- Garðarshólmi [ˈkarðar̥sˌhoulmɪ], masc. – Iceland, named after Gardar Svavarsson
- Hrímey [ˈr̥iːmˌeiː], fem.
- Hrímgrund [ˈr̥imˌkrʏnt], fem.
- Hrímland [ˈr̥imˌlant], neu. – the book Crymogaea occasionally uses "Hrímland"
- Ísafold [ˈiːsaˌfɔlt], neu.
- Ísaland [ˈiːsaˌlant], neu.
  ...og flykkjast heim að fögru landi Ísa.
- Ísland [ˈistlant] – Iceland's official and most common name
- Jökulmær [ˈjœːkʏlˌmaiːr̥], fem. – Young woman of the glacier, Iceland
- Klakinn [ˈkʰlaːcɪn], masc – literally the iceberg or the ice cover
- Norðurey [ˈnɔrðʏrˌeiː], fem. – literally meaning "northern island"
- Skerið [ˈscɛːrɪθ], neu – literally the skerry
- Snjóland [ˈstnjouːˌlant], neu. – Snowland
- Snæland [ˈstnaiːˌlant], neu. – the name that the Viking Naddoddr reputedly gave to Iceland in the 9th century meaning "snow land"
- Thule, neu. – some scholars claim Iceland was the land of Thule
- Týli [ˈtʰiːlɪ], neu. – Thule
- Þyli [ˈθɪːlɪ], neu. – Thule

Icelanders also have several nicknames for themselves, including Frónbúi [ˈfrounˌpuːɪ] or Frónverji [ˈfrounˌvɛrjɪ] ("an inhabitant of Frón") and Landi [ˈlantɪ] ("fellow countryman").

== In Latin ==
Iceland has prominently been called by three names in Latin:

- Islandia – directly from Icelandic language "Ísland"
- Snelandia – a Latinization of the more poetic name Snæland
- Insula Gardari – literally meaning "Island of Garðar", compare Garðarshólmi

== Other foreign languages ==
- Arabic: أيسلندا; Ayslanda
- Chinese: 冰岛; 冰島; Bīngdǎo, lit. 'Ice island'
- Czech: Island
- Danish, Swedish: Island
- Dutch: IJsland
- English: Iceland
- French: Islande
- Finnish: Islanti
- German: Island
- Greenlandic: Islandi
- Hungarian: Izland
- Irish: an Íoslainn
- Japanese: アイスランド; Aisurando
- Korean: 아이슬란드; Aiseurrandeu
- Norwegian: Island, Sagaøya
- Portuguese: Islândia
- Russian: Исландия; Islandiya
- Scottish Gaelic: Innis Tile, lit. 'Island of Thule'
- Spanish: Islandia
- Sanskrit: Mihikaavani
- Turkish: İzlanda
- Welsh: Gwlad Yr Iâ, lit. 'The Land of the Ice'

By ISO 639-3 code
Enter an ISO code to find the corresponding language article.
