= Põlula witch trials =

16-century with trial in Estonia

The Põlula witch trials took place in the manor Põlula in Estonia in 1542. It centered around the noblewoman Anna Zoyge, who was accused by her husband Johann Meckes of having murdered her father-in-law with the assistance of five accomplices, who were all executed for witchcraft.

== Trial ==
In 1542, the Baltic German nobleman and landowner Johann von Meckes accused his wife Anna Zoyge of having caused the death of his father and the illness of himself by use of poison, which was at that time strongly associated with witchcraft. As the landowners at that time had the right to conduct private trials on their estates, he had his wife arrested and interrogated himself. Anna Zoyge confessed guilt and pointed out her maid Anna and the cunning woman Margrete for having provided her with the poison, and they were both arrested. Anna Zoyge herself escaped and sought refuge with her brother Johann Zoyge in Haljala.

The maid Anna and Margrete claimed that Anna Zoyge was not only guilty of having poisoned her father-in-law and spouse but also attempted to cause Jürgen Maidell to fall in love with her by use of sorcery. Margrete claimed to have read three chants over salt, which had turned in to poison after three breaths from her, and that the maid Anna had taken it to Anna Zoyge with the instruction that the salt was to be placed under the feet of the intended victim; and that if consumed by the instigator, the body of the victim would be invaded by snakes and toads.

== Sentences ==
The maid Anna and Margrethe implicated a miller, a shepherd and his spouse. All five were found guilty as charged and sentenced to be executed by burning. Anna Zoyge herself was sentenced to banishment in her absence: when she returned to Põlula in 1544, she was arrested and sentenced to death, but it is unknown if the sentence was executed.

== Aftermath ==
The Põlula witch trials is significant as the first witch trial in the Baltics with more than one execution, and alongside the Paide witch trials in 1615 (where nine people were executed), it remained one of the largest witch trials in the region, where witch trials commonly only resulted in one or two executions at the same occasion and almost never more than four. In the Baltic provinces (Estonia, Livonia, Courland), witch trials conducted in the private courts of the landowners were to become common, but the information about them are not always preserved. The Põlula witch trials were also significant in the sense that in following Baltic witch trials, poisoning by enchanted food or drink, where the bodies of the victim were said to be invaded by maggots and toads, were to become a common accusation.
