= Thuridur Olafsdottir =

Icelandic witch

Thuridur Olafsdottir (Icelandic: Þuríður Ólafsdóttir; died 1678) was an Icelandic woman accused of being a witch. She was executed for sorcery by burning together with her son Jon Tordarson. She was the only woman who is confirmed to have been executed for witchcraft on Iceland.

Thuridur Olafsdottir left Skagafjörður in Norðurland with her son Jon Tordarson for Vestfjord in 1677. In their new parish, her son boasted that his mother could walk on water, which gave them a rumor of sorcery. When the vicar's wife Helga Halldorsdottir in Selárdalur fell sick, they were suspected of having caused it by the use of magic. They were sentenced guilty as charged and executed by burning, as was the method of execution for witchcraft on Iceland.

The most detailed information about the case is from the Mælifellsannáll:

"Þuríður Ólafsdóttir and her son Jon was burned in Vestfjord; they were accused of magic (galdur); the woman had lived in Skagafjörður (in Nordland) all her life and never dealt with galdur. As all paupers she had left for the West in the spring of 1677 with her son Jon, of whom little is known other than he neither had a rumor of having dealt with galdur. He allegedly claimed, that she had passed all the waterfalls in Nordland without horse nor boat, only by the help of galdur, and she must therefore have had knowledge in sorcery. People believed his lies and they were later arrested and burnt, something he did not believe would happen."

The Eyrarannáll chronicle noted: "two relations from Nordland, Þuríður and her son Jon Tordarson, were burned for having put illness upon Helga Halldorsdottir i Selardal".

The case is somewhat unusual: of the 120 witch trials held on Iceland between 1625 and 1686, only ten were against women, and though two women are traditionally considered to have been executed for this crime, the execution of Thuridur Olafsdottir is the only execution of witchcraft confirmed to have been performed.

== See also ==
- Kirkjuból witch trial

== Sources ==
- Jan Guillou, Häxornas försvarare, Piratförlaget 2002 (ISBN 916420037X)
- Ólína Þorvarðardóttir: Brennuöldin. Galdur og galdratrú í málskjölum og munnmælum. Háskólaútgáfan. Reykjavík, 2000
