= Viru-Nigula =

Borough in Estonia

- Small borough
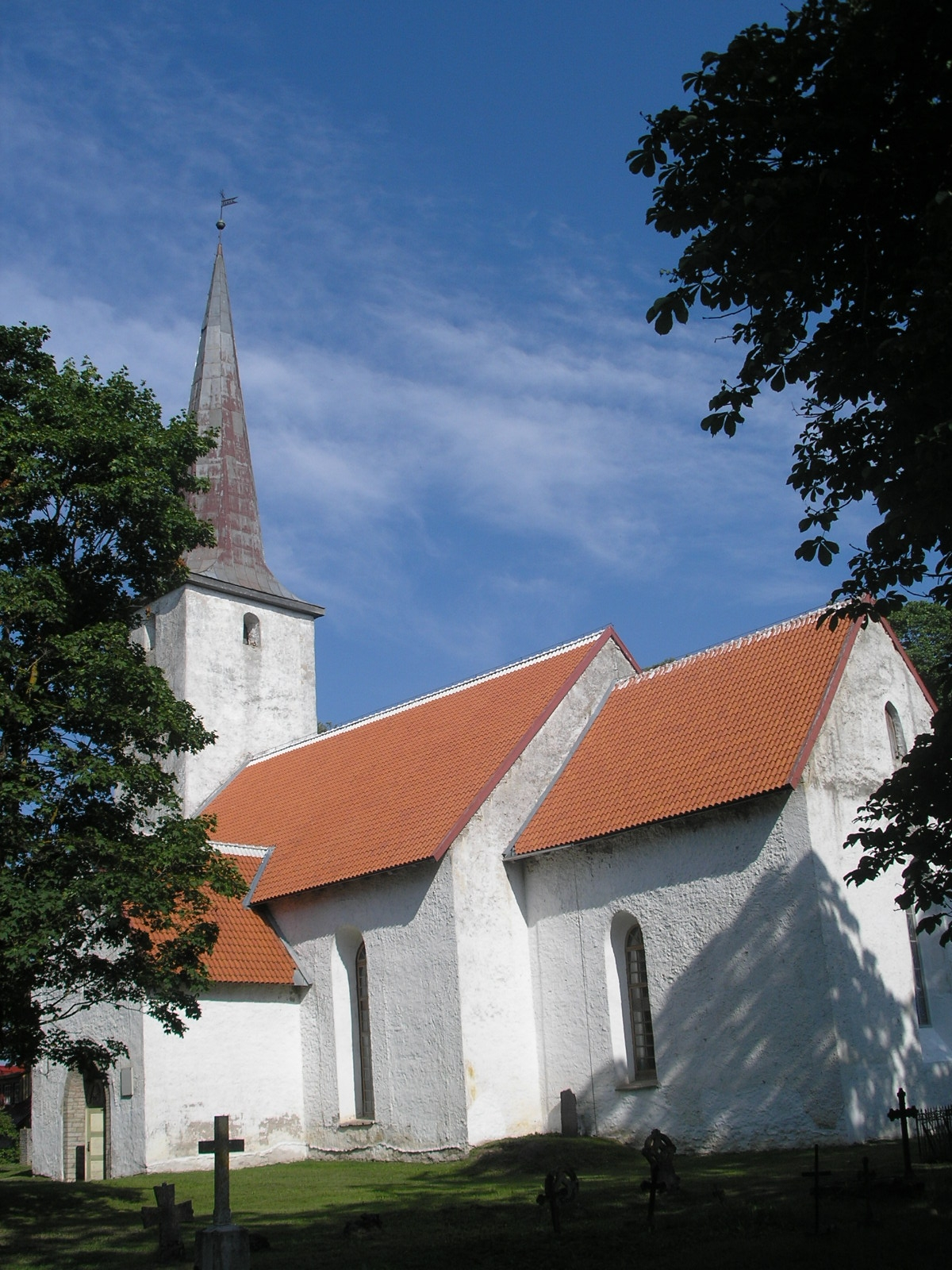
- Viru-Nigula Church

- Location in Estonia
- Coordinates: 59°26′50″N 26°41′24″E
- Country: Estonia
- County: Lääne-Viru County
- Municipality: Viru-Nigula Parish

Population (01.01.2010)
  - Total: 336

Viru-Nigula (German: Maholm) is a small borough (Estonian: alevik) in Lääne-Viru County, Estonia. It is the administrative centre of Viru-Nigula Parish. Viru-Nigula has a population of 336 (as of 1 January 2010).

Viru-Nigula's church was built some time between the 15th and 18th centuries.
