= Aseri Parish =

Former municipality of Estonia

Aseri Parish Aseri vald
- Former municipality
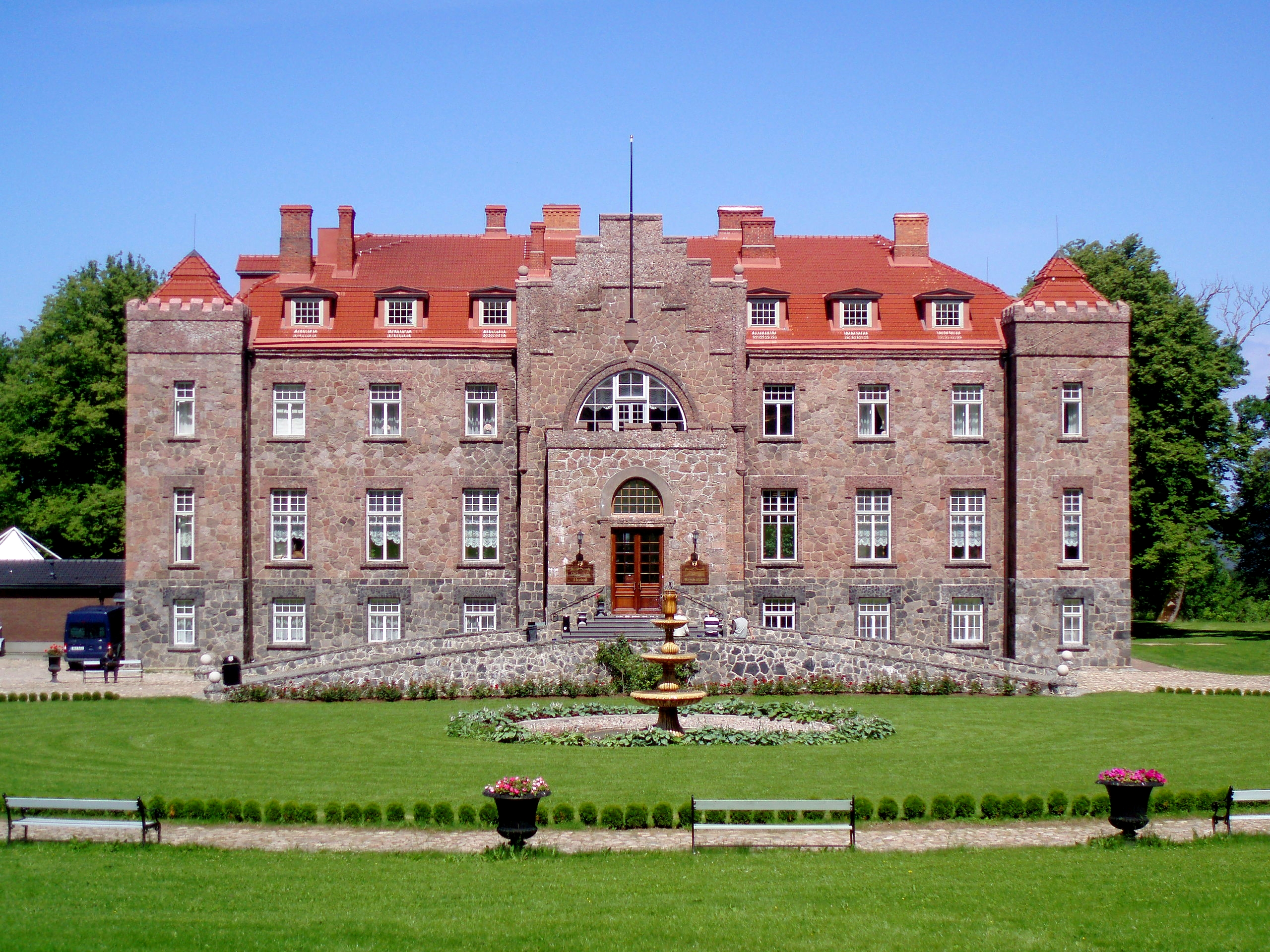
- Kalvi manor

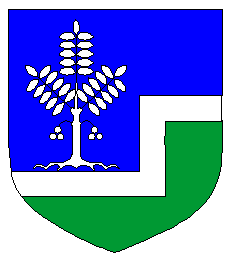
- Flag Coat of arms

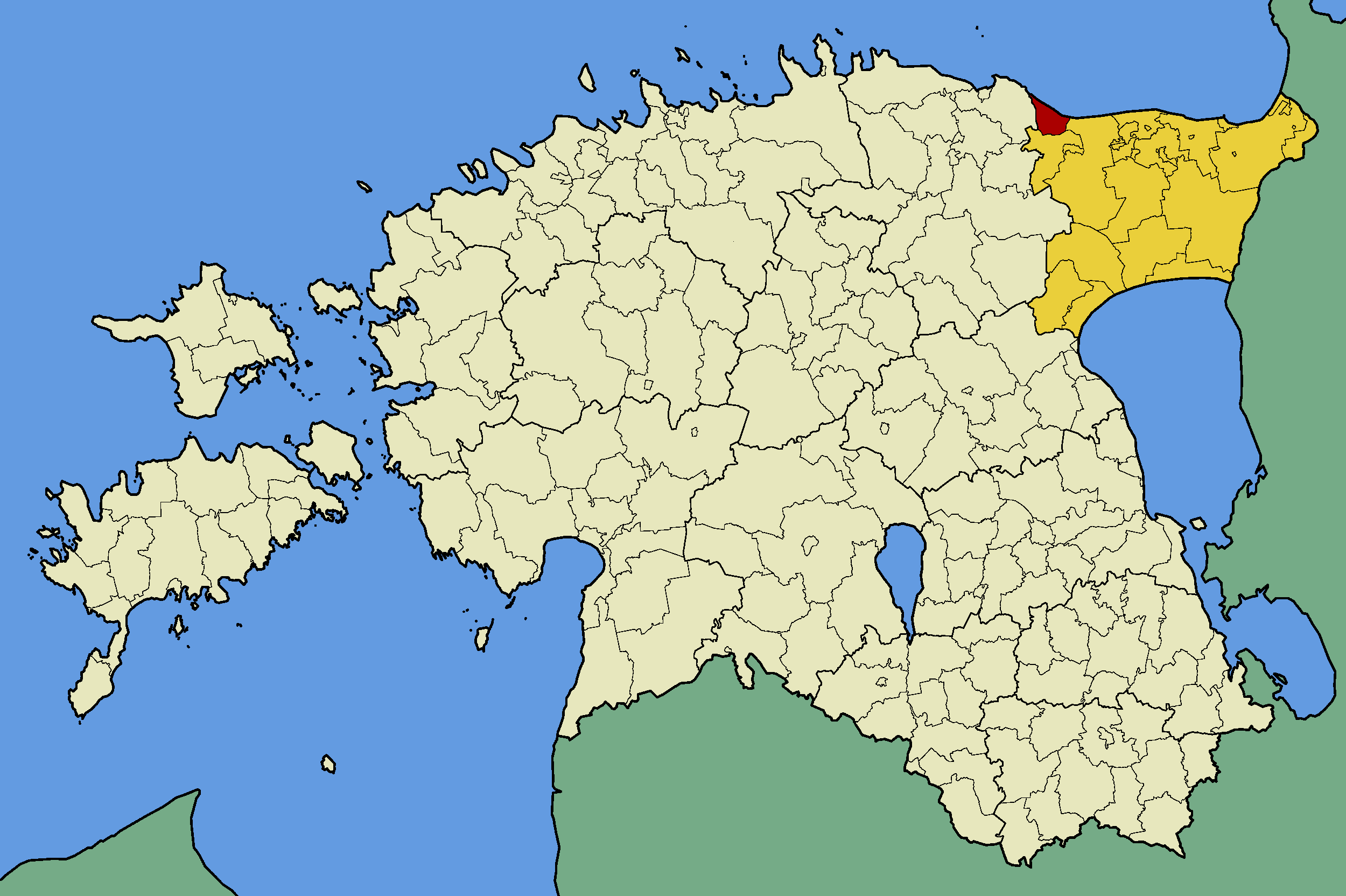
- Aseri Parish within Ida-Viru County.
- Country: Estonia
- County: Ida-Viru County
- Administrative centre: Aseri

Area
  - Total: 67.14 km^{2} (25.92 sq mi)

Population
  - Total: 1,555
  - Density: 23.16/km^{2} (59.99/sq mi)
- Website: www.aserivv.ee

Aseri Parish was a rural municipality of Ida-Viru County in northern Estonia. It had a population of 1555 and an area of 67.14 km^{2} (25.92 sq mi).

== Settlements ==
Small borough

Aseri

Villages

Aseriaru - Kalvi - Kestla - Koogu - Kõrkküla - Kõrtsialuse - Oru - Rannu
