= Mahu-Rannametsa Nature Reserve =

Protected area in Estonia

- Location within Estonia
- Location: Estonia
- Coordinates: 59°29′N 26°45′E
- Area: 413 ha (1,020 acres)
- Established: 2006

Mahu-Rannametsa Nature Reserve is a nature reserve which is located in Lääne-Viru County, Estonia.

The area of the nature reserve is 413 ha.

The protected area was founded in 2006 to protect valuable habitat types and threatened species in Mahu, Pärna and Unukse village (all in former Viru-Nigula Parish).
