= Vardy =

Vardy is a surname. Notable people with the surname include:

- Ágnes Huszár Várdy, American academic
- Alexander Vardy (born 1963–2022), Russian-Israeli-American electrical engineer and coding theorist
- Donna Vardy (born 1971), English squash player
- Jamie Vardy (born 1987), English association football player
- John Vardy (1718–1765), English architect attached to the Royal Office of Works from 1736
- Nathan Vardy (born 1991), Australian rules football player
- Nigel Vardy (born 1969), English mountaineer
- Oliver Vardy (1906–1980), Canadian broadcaster, business executive, civil servant, and politician
- Peter Vardy (disambiguation), multiple people
- Rebekah Vardy (born 1982), English media personality
- Royce Vardy (born 1980), Australian rules football player
- Steven Béla Várdy (1935–2018), American historian

== See also ==
- Reg Vardy Band, brass band based in North East England
- Vardy Community School, Presbyterian mission school in the Vardy community of Hancock County, Tennessee, USA
- Vardy v Rooney: A Courtroom Drama, British television series
- Vardiya, a neighborhood in Haifa, Israel
- Vardja (disambiguation)
- Varudi, a village in Lääne-Viru County, Estonia
