= Kunda village =

Village in Estonia

Kunda
- Village
- Location in Estonia
- Coordinates: 59°29′19″N 26°33′20″E
- Country: Estonia
- County: Lääne-Viru County
- Municipality: Viru-Nigula Parish

Population (01.01.2011)
  - Total: 23

Kunda is a village in Viru-Nigula Parish, Lääne-Viru County, in northeastern Estonia, just southeast of the town of Kunda. Kunda village has a population of 23 as of 1 January 2011.

== Notable people ==
- Jüri Parijõgi, writer, lived in Kunda village.
- Michael Wittlich, chemist, was born there.
