= Vasta =

Vasta may refer to:

- Vasta, Estonia, a village
- Vasta Blackwood or Vas Blackwood (born 1962), British actor
- Vasta (surname)

== See also ==
- Bath broom (Finnish: vasta)
