= Yary =

Yary is a surname. Notable people with the surname include:

- Richard Yary (1898–1969), Ukrainian nationalist journalist, politician, and military figure
- Ron Yary (born 1946), American football player

== See also ==
- Hary (name)
- Lary
- Yardy
