= Malla, Estonia =

Village in Estonia

Malla
- Village
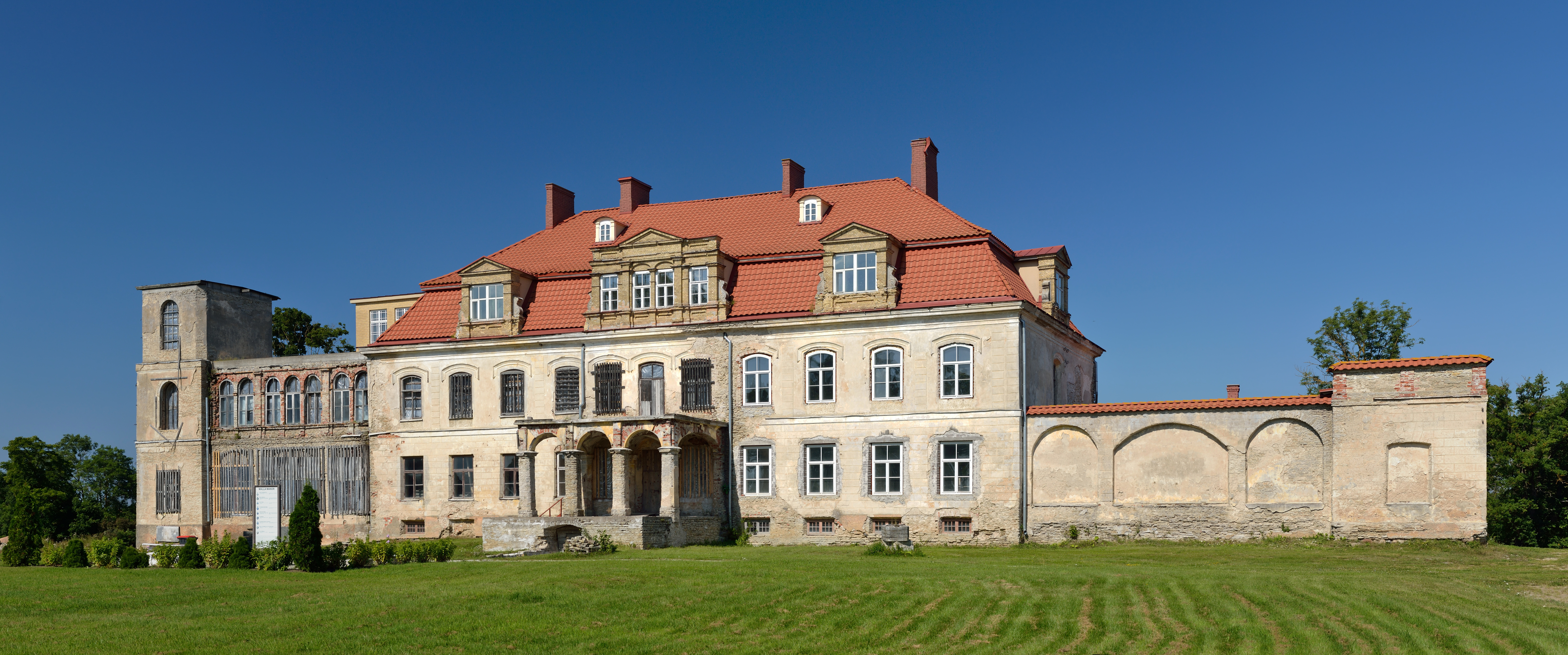
- Malla Manor

- Location in Estonia
- Coordinates: 59°30′04″N 26°35′18″E
- Country: Estonia
- County: Lääne-Viru County
- Municipality: Viru-Nigula Parish

Population (01.01.2011)
  - Total: 82

Malla is a village in Viru-Nigula Parish, Lääne-Viru County, in northeastern Estonia. It is located about 3 km east of the town of Kunda. On 1 January 2011 Malla had a population of 82.

== Malla manor ==
Malla manor traces its history back to 1443, when it is first recorded in written sources. During that time, there was a small castle at the site. Around 1620, the estate became the property of Swedish field marshal Gustav Horn. In 1651–1654, he commissioned architect Zakarias Hoffmann to erect a new manor house on the site. The house burnt down during the Great Northern War, and the current building received its appearance in the 1880s. The exterior of the manor can be seen in the film November, as the house of the Baron.
