= Kalikula =

Kalikula may refer to:

- Kalikula, a Kali worshiping sect of Hinduism
- Kaliküla, a village in Jõgeva County, Estonia
- Kaliküla, Lääne-Viru County, a village in Lääne-Viru County, Estonia
