= Vitsut =

Family name

Vitsut is an Estonian surname. Notable people with the surname include:

- Mihkel Vitsut (1866–1933), Estonian chemist and professor
- Toomas Vitsut (born 1960), Estonian politician and businessman
