= Kiviküla =

Kiviküla may refer to several places in Estonia:

- Kiviküla, Lääne County, village in Haapsalu, Lääne County
- Kiviküla, Lääne-Viru County, village in Viru-Nigula Parish, Lääne-Viru County
- Kiviküla, Valga County, village in Valga Parish, Valga County
