= Hairy =

Hairy may refer to:

- people or animals covered in hairs or fur
- plants covered in trichomes
- insects covered in setae
- people nicknamed "the Hairy"
- Hairy (gene)

== See also ==
- Hairies, a fictional people
- Haerye, a Korean text
- Hary (disambiguation)
