= Kuura =

Kuura may refer to several places in Estonia:

- Kuura, Lääne-Viru County, village in Estonia
- Kuura, Võru County, village in Estonia
- Kuura River, river in Estonia
