= Yardy =

Yardy is a surname. Notable people with the surname include:

- Michael Yardy (born 1980), English cricketer
- Valery Yardy (1948–1994), Soviet cyclist

== See also ==
- Pardy
- Vardy
- Yary
