= Villavere =

Village in Estonia

- Village
- Location in Estonia
- Coordinates: 59°29′11″N 26°35′55″E
- Country: Estonia
- County: Lääne-Viru County
- Municipality: Viru-Nigula Parish

Population (20.02.2012)
  - Total: 18

Villavere is a village in Viru-Nigula Parish, Lääne-Viru County in northern Estonia. It is located about 3 km (2 mi) southeast of the town of Kunda. Villavere has a population of 18 (as of 20 February 2012).
