= Marineau =

Marineau is a surname. Notable people with the surname include:

- Dennis Marineau (born 1962), Canadian bobsledder
- Mathieu Marineau (born 1990), Canadian male weightlifter
- Michèle Marineau (born 1955), Canadian writer and translator

== See also ==
- Guiles v. Marineau, 461 F.3d 320 (2d. Cir. 2006)
- Marin (disambiguation)
- Marina
- Marinu
