= Siberi =

Village in Estonia

- Village
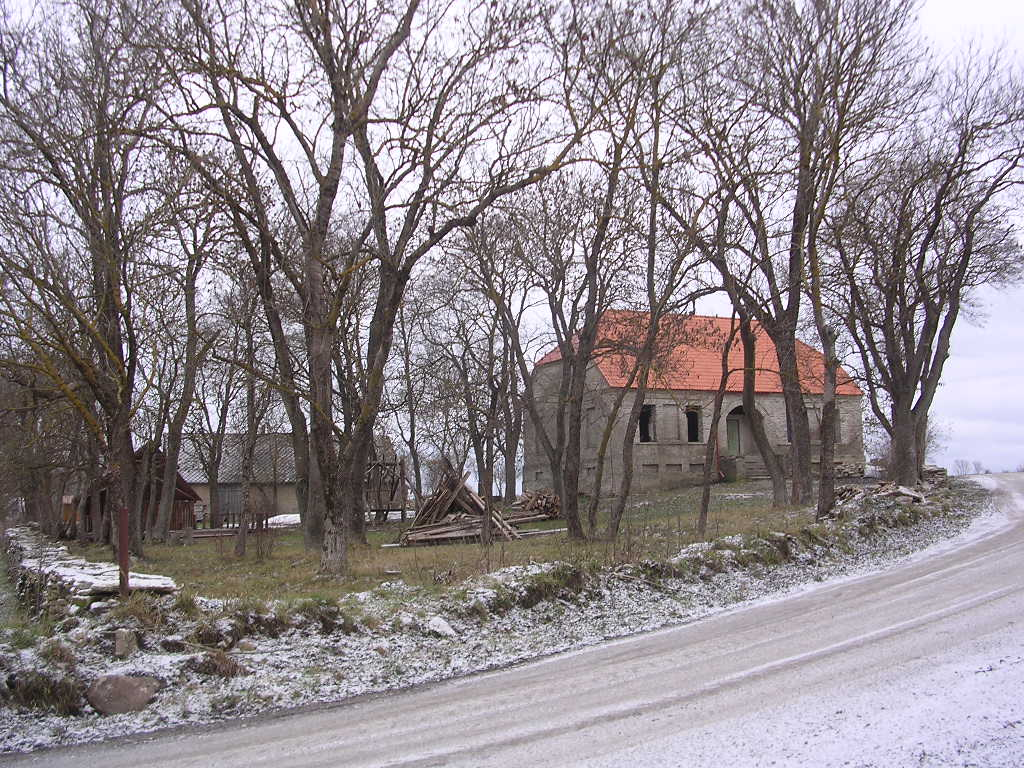

- Location in Estonia
- Coordinates: 59°28′20″N 26°33′15″E
- Country: Estonia
- County: Lääne-Viru County
- Municipality: Viru-Nigula Parish

Population (01.01.2011)
  - Total: 18

Siberi is a village in Viru-Nigula Parish, Lääne-Viru County, in northeastern Estonia. It has a population of 18 (as of 1 January 2011).

Writer Jüri Parijõgi was born in Siberi in 1892.

The Siberi village inspired the name of the Birch Water company, Sibberi. Birch water is technically 100% birch sap. It is traditional in Northern and Eastern Europe. Whilst looking to source the raw Birch sap, the co-founders came across this Siberi village and loved the name, only changing the spelling for pronunciation purposes.
