= Kurna (disambiguation) =

Kurna may refer to:

- Kurna, name of three villages on the West Bank of the River Nile near Luxor in Egypt
- Kurna, Harju County, village in Rae Parish, Harju County, Estonia
- Kurna, Lääne-Viru County, village in Viru-Nigula Parish, Lääne-Viru County, Estonia
- Kourna, a village and a lake in Crete, Greece
- Qurnah, village in Iraq at the confluence of the Tigris and Euphrates Rivers in modern-day Iraq
- West Qurna Field, one of Iraq's largest oil fields
