= Kõrkküla, Lääne-Viru County =

Village in Estonia

Kõrkküla
- Village
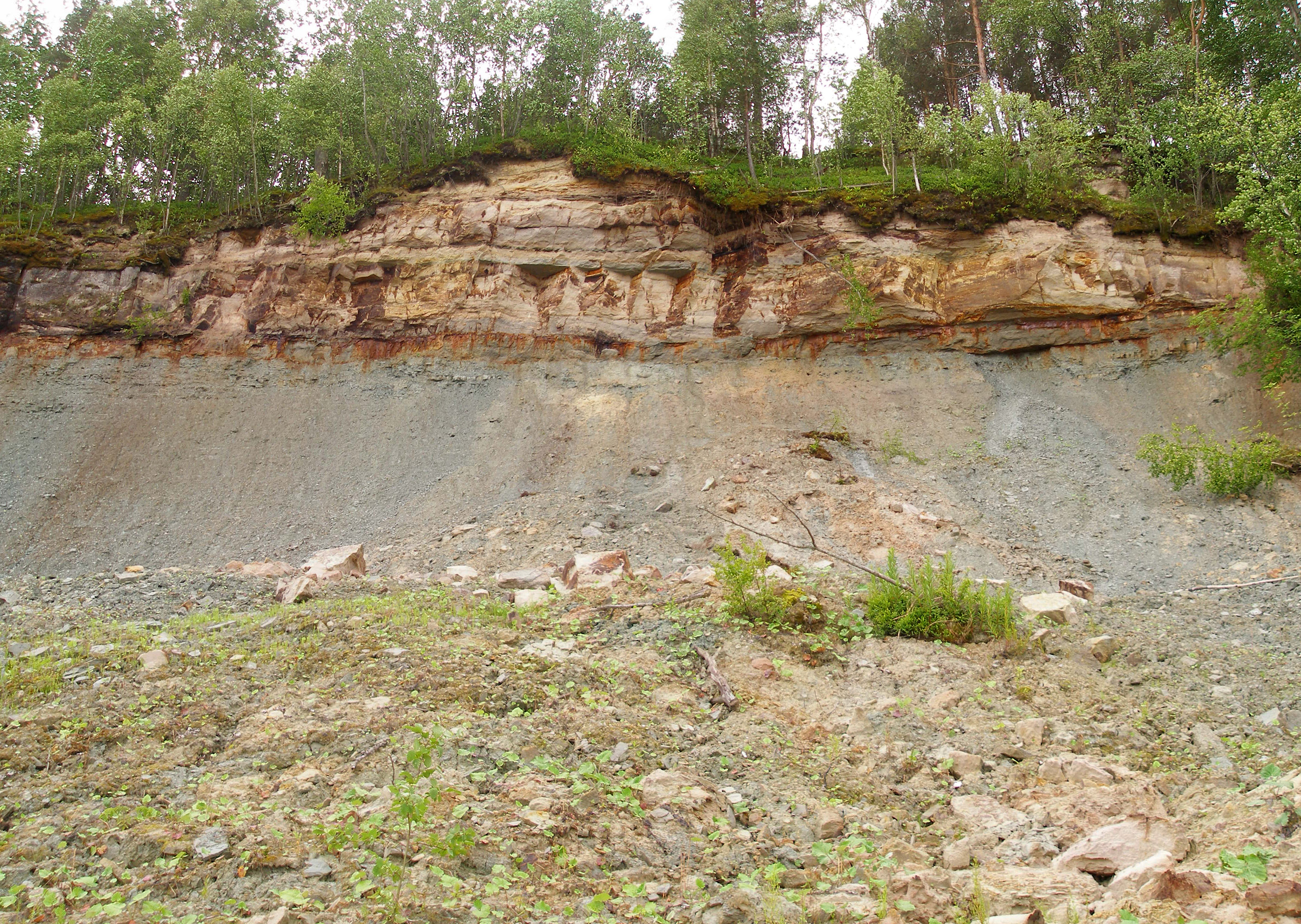
- Baltic Klint's Cambrian berm in Kõrkküla.

- Location in Estonia
- Coordinates: 59°25′45″N 26°56′11″E
- Country: Estonia
- County: Lääne-Viru County
- Municipality: Viru-Nigula Parish
- First mentioned: 1466

Population (10.01.2012)
  - Total: 40

Kõrkküla is a village in Viru-Nigula Parish, Lääne-Viru County in northeastern Estonia. It's located on the coast of the Gulf of Finland, by the Tallinn–Narva (Saint Petersburg) road (part of E20), just southeast of Aseri. Kõrkküla has a population of 40 (as of 10 January 2012).

Kõrkküla was first mentioned in 1466.

There is a limestone cross beside the road to memorialize a Russian boyar Vassili Rosladin, who was killed there in 1590.

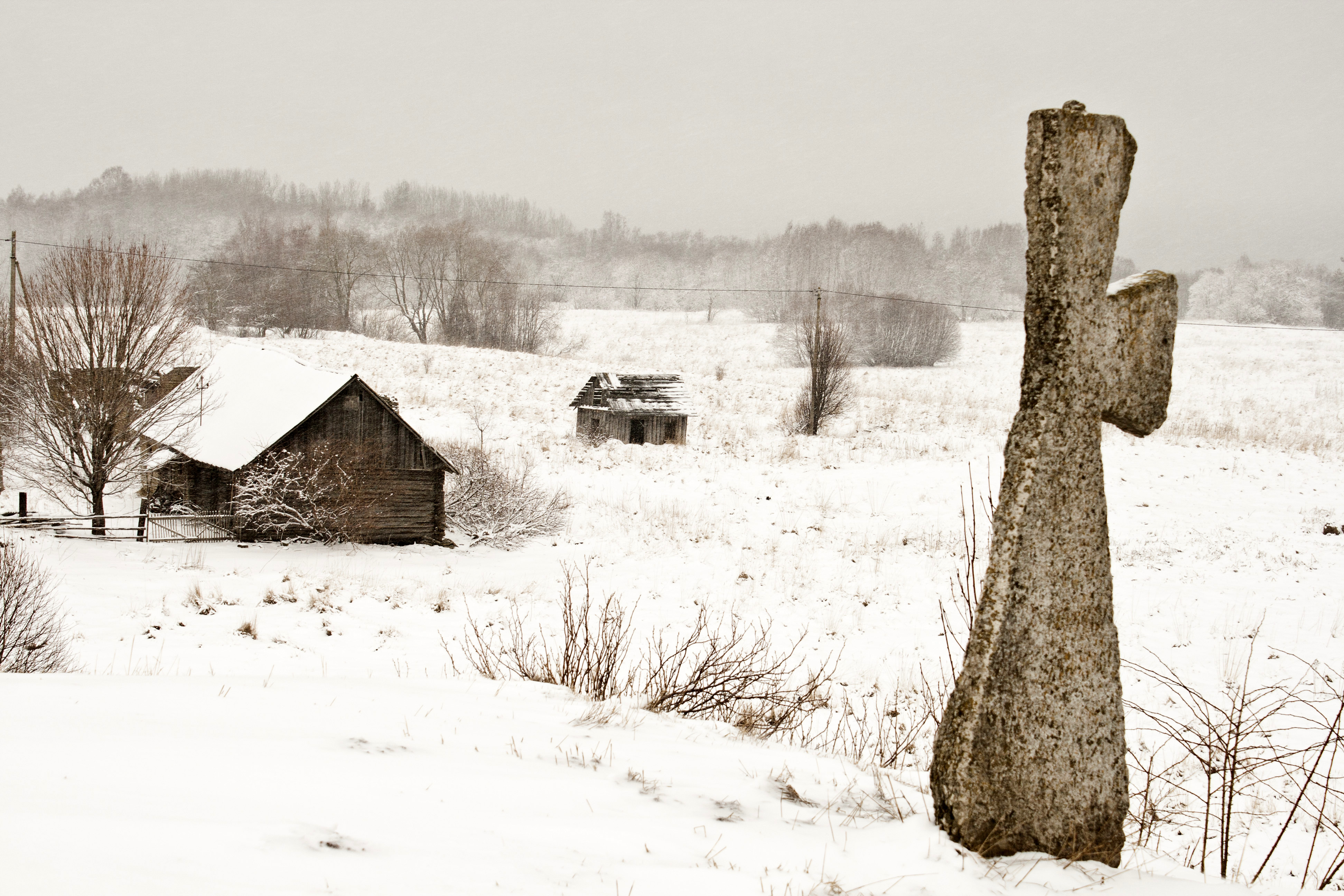
Limestone cross
