= Pada-Aruküla =

Village in Estonia

- Village
- Location within Estonia
- Coordinates: 59°26′N 26°46′E
- Country: Estonia
- County: Lääne-Viru County
- Parish: Viru-Nigula Parish
- Time zone: UTC+2 (EET)
  - Summer (DST): UTC+3 (EEST)

Pada-Aruküla is a small village in Viru-Nigula Parish, Lääne-Viru County, in northeastern Estonia. It is located approximately 71 miles or 114 kilometres east of Tallinn. The village is close to the coast of the Gulf of Finland and a short drive away from Lake Peipus, which divides Estonia from Russia.
