= Hary (disambiguation) =

Hary is a commune in northern France. Hary or Háry may also refer to

- Hary (name)
- Cyclone Hary, the strongest tropical cyclone in 2001–02 in South-West Indian Ocean
- Háry János, a Hungarian folk opera
- Háry János (1941 film), a Hungarian musical film
- Háry János (1965 film), a Hungarian musical film
