= Linnuse, Lääne-Viru County =

Village in Estonia

Linnuse
- Village
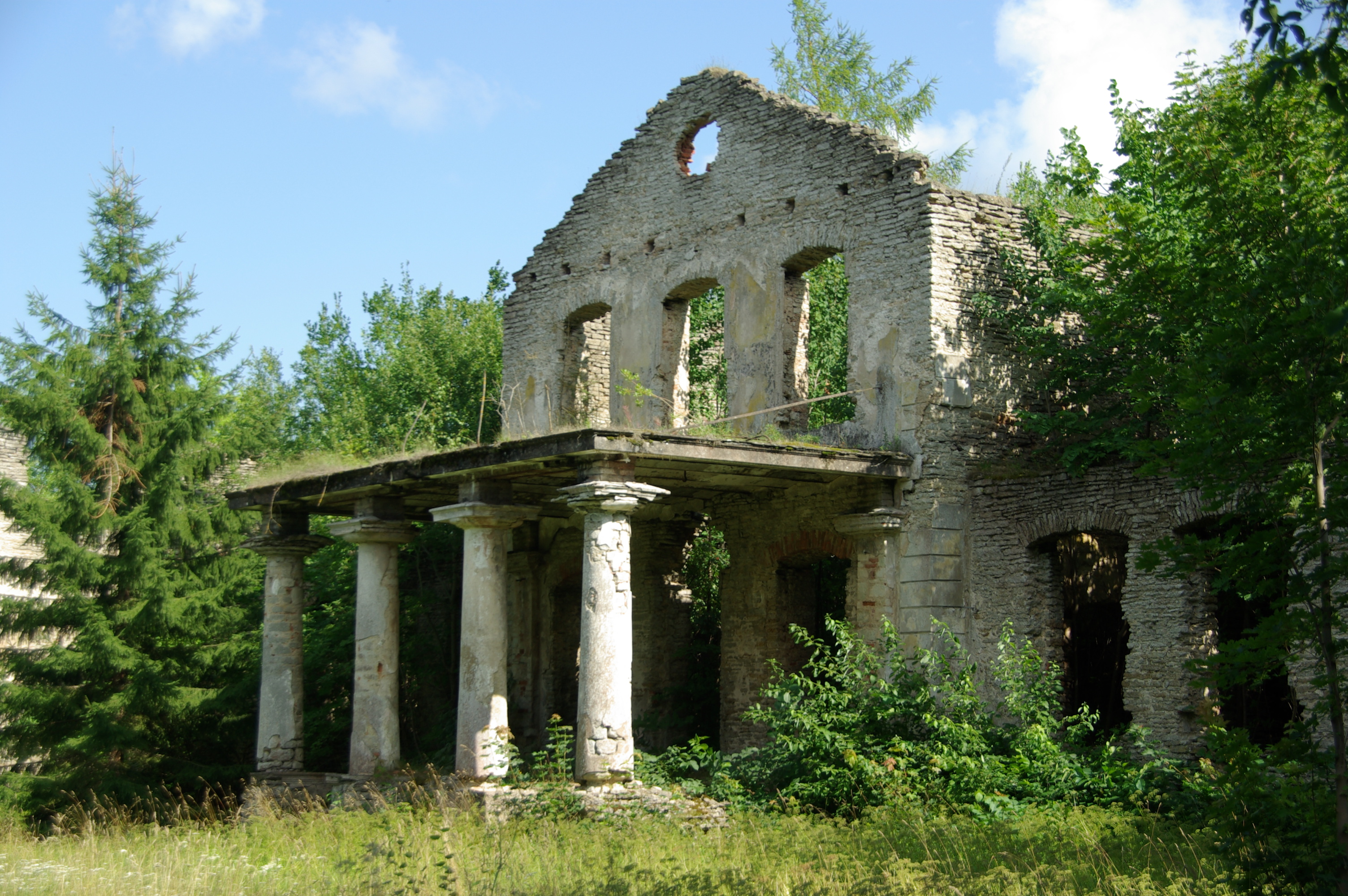
- Ruins of the former Kunda Manor in Linnuse

- Location within Estonia
- Coordinates: 59°29′03″N 26°31′52″E
- Country: Estonia
- County: Lääne-Viru County
- Parish: Viru-Nigula Parish
- Time zone: UTC+2 (EET)
  - Summer (DST): UTC+3 (EEST)

Linnuse is a village in Viru-Nigula Parish, Lääne-Viru County, in northeastern Estonia.
