= Metsavälja =

Village in Estonia

- Village
- Location within Estonia
- Coordinates: 59°25′N 26°44′E
- Country: Estonia
- County: Lääne-Viru County
- Parish: Viru-Nigula Parish
- Time zone: UTC+2 (EET)
  - Summer (DST): UTC+3 (EEST)

Metsavälja is a village in Viru-Nigula Parish, Lääne-Viru County, in northeastern Estonia.
