= Aasukalda =

Village in Estonia

- Village
- Location in Estonia
- Coordinates: 59°27′01″N 26°43′16″E
- Country: Estonia
- County: Lääne-Viru County
- Municipality: Viru-Nigula Parish

Population (01.01.2010)
  - Total: 27

Aasukalda is a village in Viru-Nigula Parish, Lääne-Viru County, in northeastern Estonia. It has a population of 27 (as of 1 January 2010).

Pada org pine tree (Pada oru mänd) is located in Aasukalda village, its parameters are: perimeter 5,2 m; height 14 m.
