= Samma, Estonia =

Village in Estonia

Samma
- Village
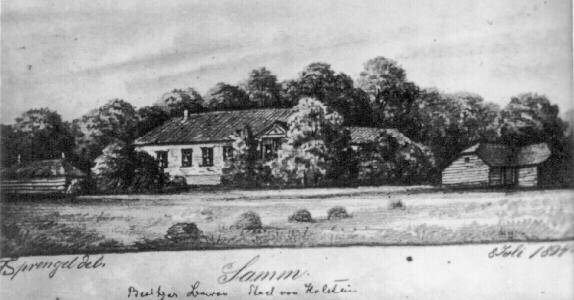
- Samma Manor in 1894.

- Location in Estonia
- Coordinates: 59°24′32″N 26°41′26″E
- Country: Estonia
- County: Lääne-Viru County
- Municipality: Viru-Nigula Parish

Population (01.01.2011)
  - Total: 32

Samma is a village in Viru-Nigula Parish, Lääne-Viru County, in northeastern Estonia. It has a population of 32 (as of 1 January 2011).
