= Vardja =

Vardja may refer to several places in Estonia:

- Vardja, Harju County, village in Kose Parish, Harju County
- Vardja, Põlva County, village in Põlva Parish, Põlva County
- Vardja, Viljandi County, village in Viljandi Parish, Viljandi County
