= Peter Vardy =

Peter Vardy may refer to:

- Peter Vardy (theologian) (born 1945), British academic, philosopher, theologian and author
- Sir Peter Vardy (businessman) (born 1947), British businessman in the retail automotive industry
- Peter Vardy (footballer) (born 1976), former Australian rules footballer
