= Aseriaru =

Village in Estonia

Coordinates: 59°28′N 26°50′E

- Village
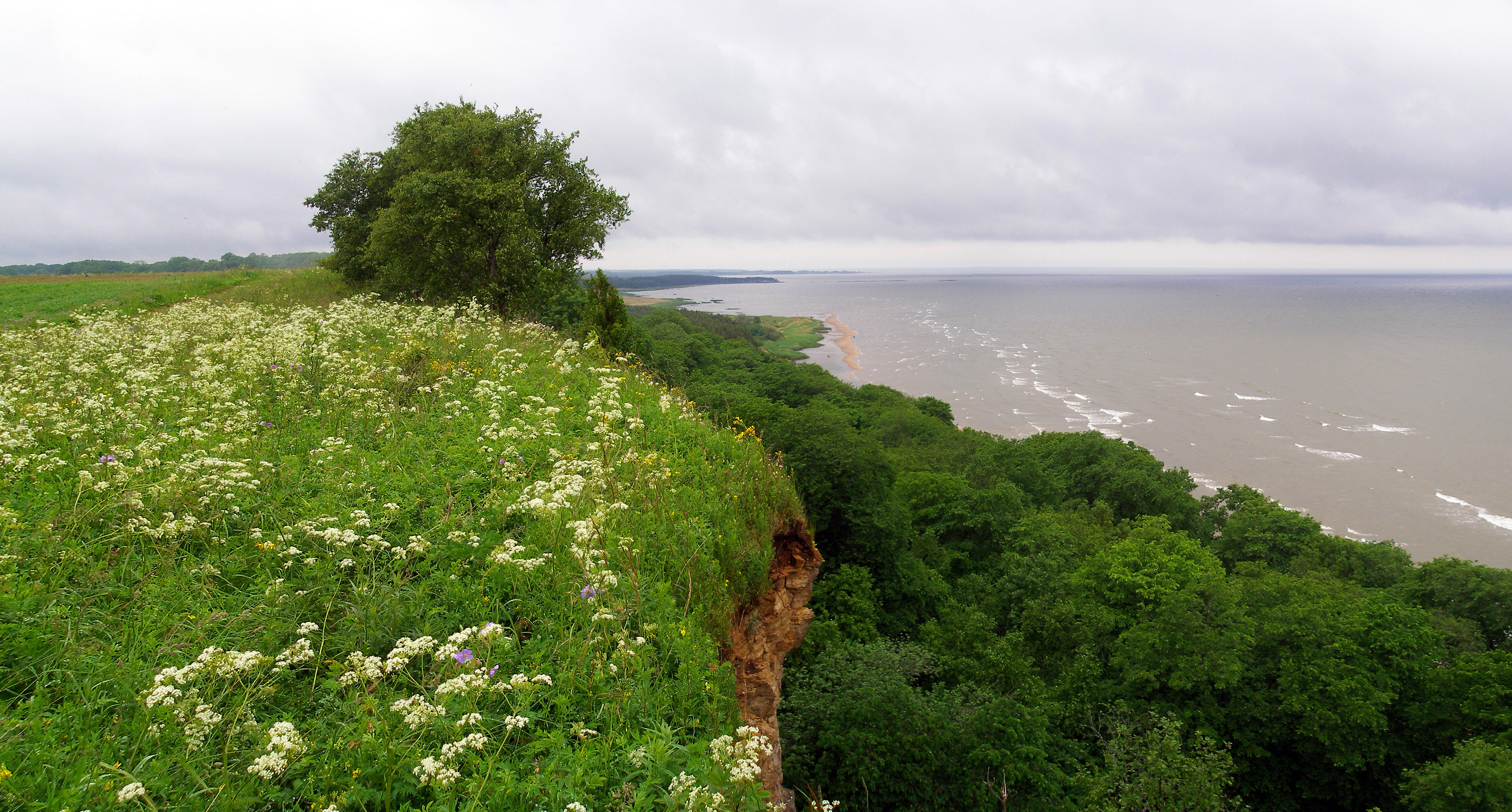
- Interactive map of Aseriaru
- Country: Estonia
- County: Lääne-Viru County
- Parish: Viru-Nigula Parish
- Time zone: UTC+2 (EET)
  - Summer (DST): UTC+3 (EEST)

Aseriaru is a village in Viru-Nigula Parish, Lääne-Viru County in northeastern Estonia.
