= Kaliküla, Lääne-Viru County =

Village in Estonia

Kaliküla
- Village
- Location within Estonia
- Coordinates: 59°30′16″N 26°27′37″E
- Country: Estonia
- County: Lääne-Viru County
- Parish: Viru-Nigula Parish

Area
  - Total: 2.76 km^{2} (1.07 sq mi)

Population (2011)
  - Total: 20
  - Density: 7.2/km^{2} (19/sq mi)
- Time zone: UTC+2 (EET)
  - Summer (DST): UTC+3 (EEST)

Kaliküla is a village in Viru-Nigula Parish, Lääne-Viru County, in northeastern Estonia.
