= Lary =

Lary is a surname, given name, or nickname, and may refer to:

As a surname:

- Al Lary (1928–2001), American baseball player
- Frank Lary (1930–2017), American baseball player
- Lyn Lary (1906–1973), American baseball player
- Yale Lary (1930–2017), American football player, businessman, and politician

As a given or nickname:

- Lary (singer) (born 1986), German singer and model
- Lary Sorensen (born 1955), American baseball player

In other uses:

- Los Angeles Railway

== See also ==
- Larry (disambiguation)
- Lari (disambiguation)
