= Ágnes Huszár Várdy =

Ágnes Huszár Várdy was a Professor of English and Communications at Robert Morris University. She was also Adjunct Professor of Comparative Literature at Duquesne University. She was an invited member of the International P.E.N. (1985) and a Plenary Member of the Hungarian Academy of Sciences (2004).

She died on July 18, 2022, in Budapest, Hungary.

== Works ==
She was the author, co-author, or co-editor of eleven scholarly books and over 100 articles, essays, and reviews. She was also the author of two historical-social novels:

- Mimi (English 1997, 1999, 2007; Hungarian 1997, 2007),
- My Italian Summer (English 2007; Hungarian 2013),

Her most recent scholarly books, mostly co-authored or co-edited with the late Professor Steven Béla Várdy, include

- A study in Austrian romanticism: Hungarian influences in Lenau's poetry. With an historical introd. on the age of romanticism, Buffalo, Hungarian Cultural Foundation, 1974. (In 104 libraries according to WorldCat)
- (with Király, Béla K., and Steven Béla Várdy)Society in Change: Studies in Honor of Béla K. Király. Boulder: East European Monographs, 1983. ( In 274 libraries according to WorldCat)
- (with Steven Béla Várdy & T Hunt Tooley) Ethnic Cleansing in Twentieth-Century Europe (2003) (In 233 libraries according to WorldCat)
- Struggles in the New World [Újvilági küzdelmek] (2005)
- Stalin’s Gulag: The Hungarian Experience (2007)
- Hungarians in the Slave Labor Camps of the Gulag [Magyarok a Gulág rabszolgatáboraiban] (2007)
- German Contributions to Western Civilization (2009)
- Hungarian Americans in the Current of History (2010)

== Grants ==
Várdy was the recipient of:

- Hungary’s “Berzsenyi-Prize” (1992)
- Árpád Academy’s “Gold Medal” (1998)
- Rákóczi Foundation’s “Pro Libertate Award” (2005)
- Gold Medal of the Hungarian Revolutionary Committee (2006)
- Honorary Doctorate from King Louis the Great University (2007).

She was an active member of the American Hungarian Educators’ Association (since 1975), as well as of the Hungarian Cultural Society of Western Pennsylvania that she co-founded in 1972.

Most recently she was honored (jointly with her husband) with a Festschrift entitled Hungary Through the Centuries: Studies in Honor of Professors Steven Béla Várdy and Agnes Huszár Várdy, The book was edited by Professor Richard P. Mulcahy of the University of Pittsburgh, with the collaboration of Drs. János Angi and Tibor Glant of the University of Debrecen in Hungary.
