= Viru-Nigula Parish =

Municipality of Estonia (2017)

Coordinates: 59°26′44″N 26°41′22″E

Viru-Nigula Parish Viru-Nigula vald
- Municipality of Estonia
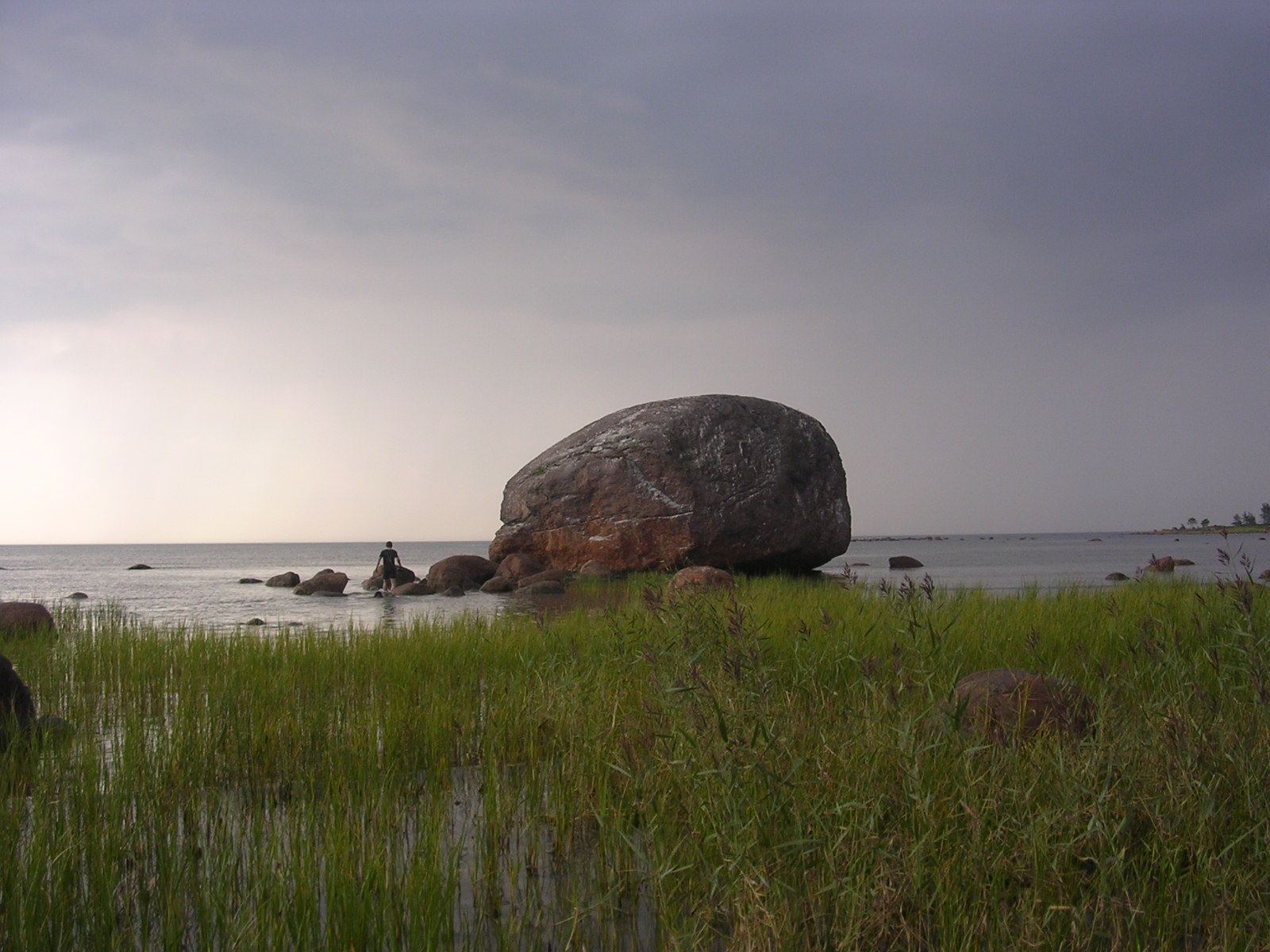
- Ehalkivi rock

- Flag Coat of arms

- Viru-Nigula Parish within Lääne-Viru County
- Country: Estonia
- County: Lääne-Viru County
- Administrative centre: Viru-Nigula

Area
  - Total: 312 km^{2} (120 sq mi)

Population (01.01.2011)
  - Total: 1,293
  - Density: 4.14/km^{2} (10.7/sq mi)
- ISO 3166 code: EE-903
- Website: www.viru-nigula.ee

Viru-Nigula Parish (Estonian: Viru-Nigula vald) is a rural municipality of Estonia, in Lääne-Viru County. It has a population of 1,293 (as of 1 January 2011) and an area of 312 km^{2} (120 sq mi).

== Settlements ==
Towns
Kunda

Small boroughs
Aseri, Viru-Nigula

Villages

Aasukalda - Aseriaru - Iila - Kabeli - Kaliküla - Kalvi - Kanguristi - Kestla - Kiviküla - Koila - Koogu - Kõrkküla - Kõrtsialuse - Kunda - Kurna - Kutsala - Kuura - Letipea - Linnuse - Mahu - Malla - Marinu - Metsavälja - Nugeri - Ojaküla - Oru - Paasküla - Pada - Pada-Aruküla - Pärna - Pikaristi - Rannu - Samma - Selja - Siberi - Simunamäe - Toomika - Tüükri - Unukse - Varudi - Vasta - Villavere - Võrkla

== Religion ==
The majority of the older than fifteen years residents of Viru-Nigula parish, 70.3% are religiously unaffiliated. 18.8% identify as Orthodox, 5.7% as Lutheran, other Christian denominations in the parish make up 2.0% of the population. 3.2% of the population follows other religions or did not specify their religious affiliation.

== Gallery ==
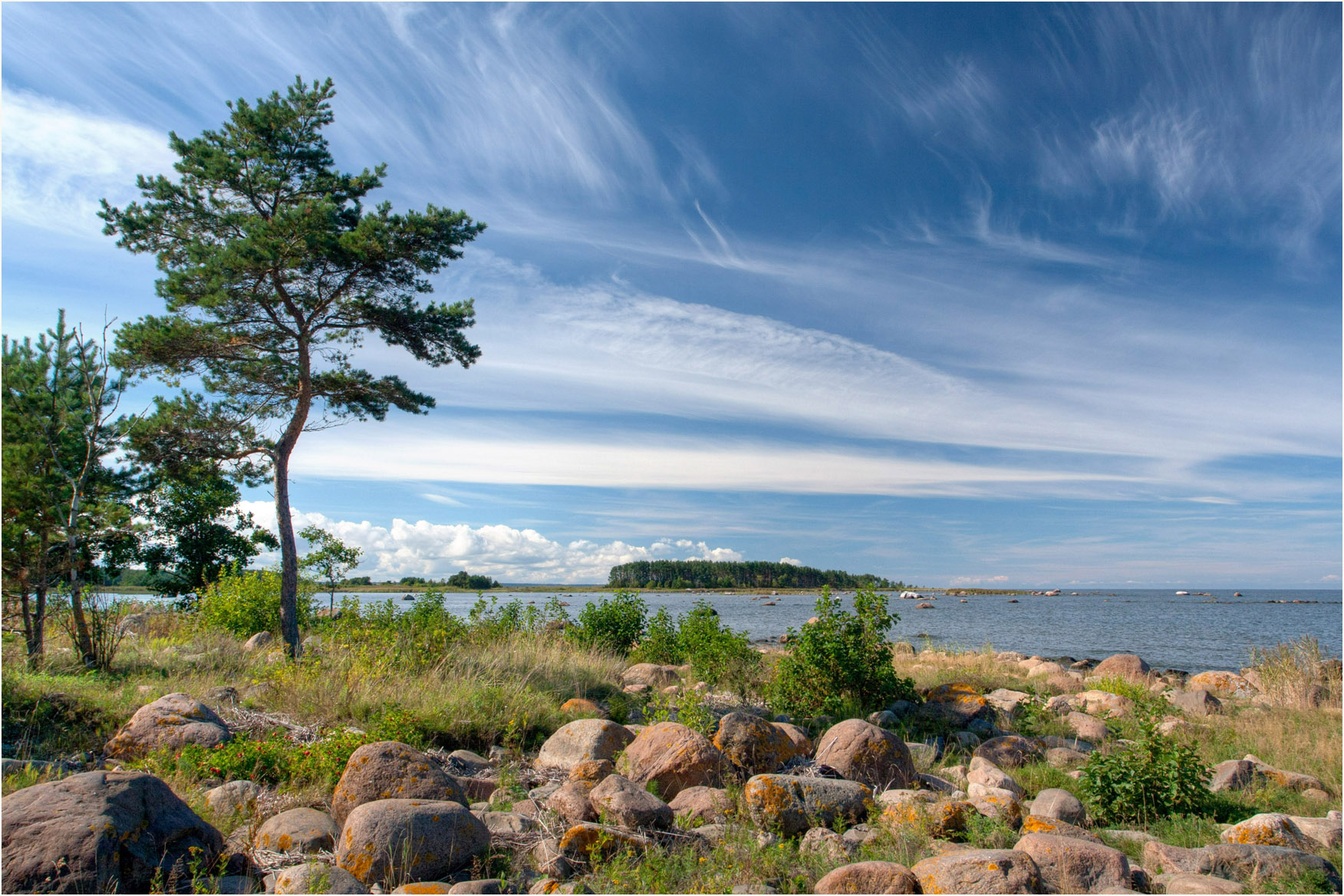
Letipea coast

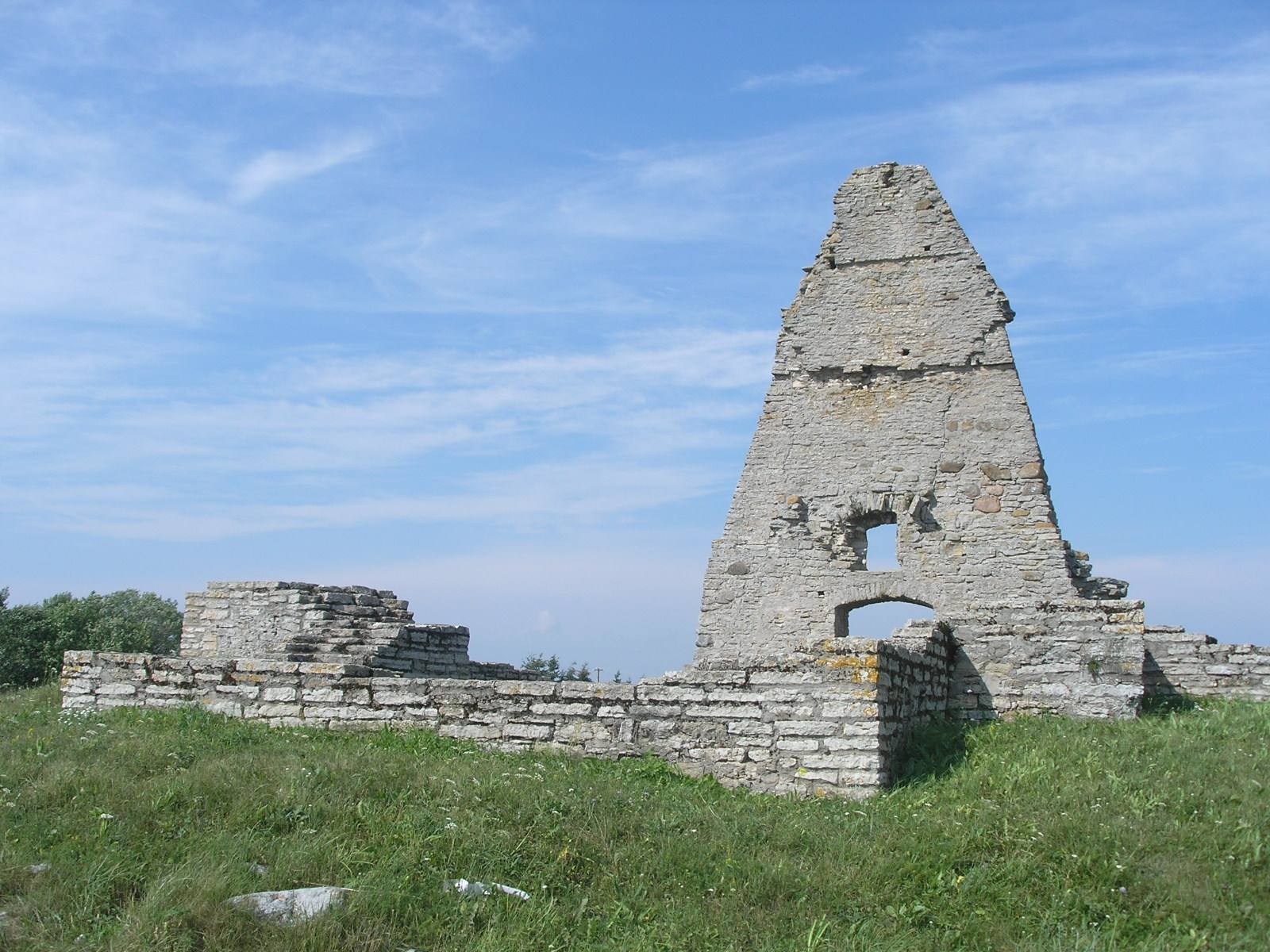
Maarja Chapel ruins

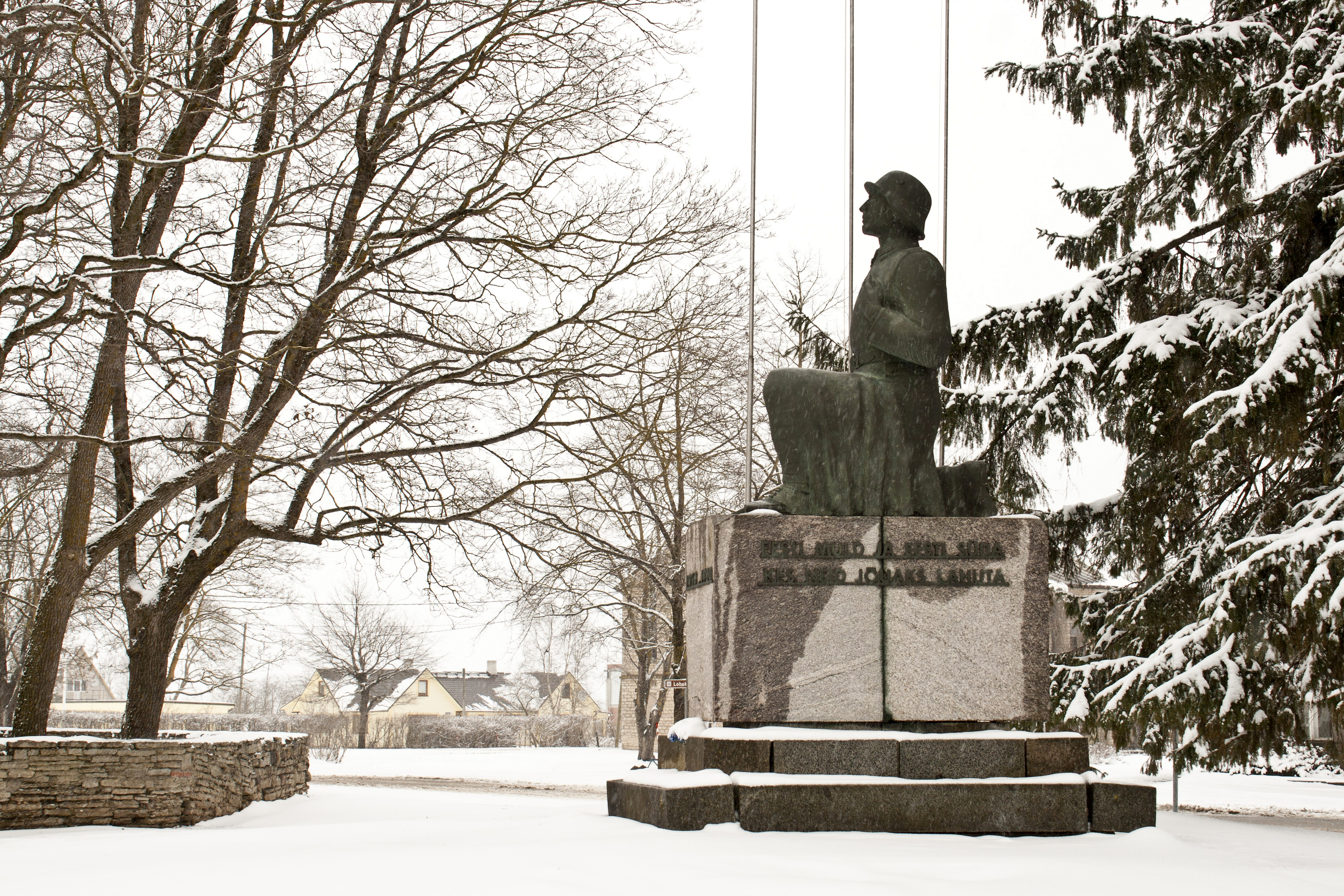
Estonian War of Independence Memorial

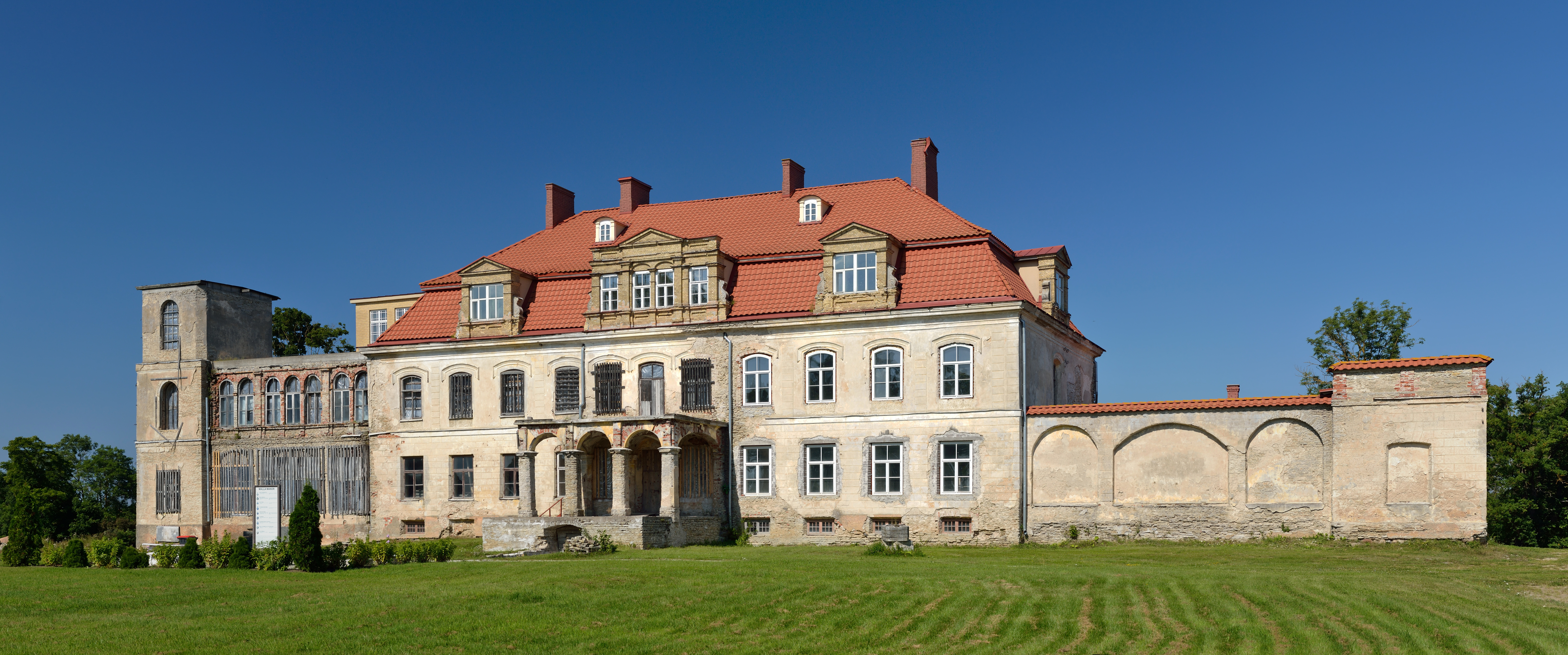
Malla manor

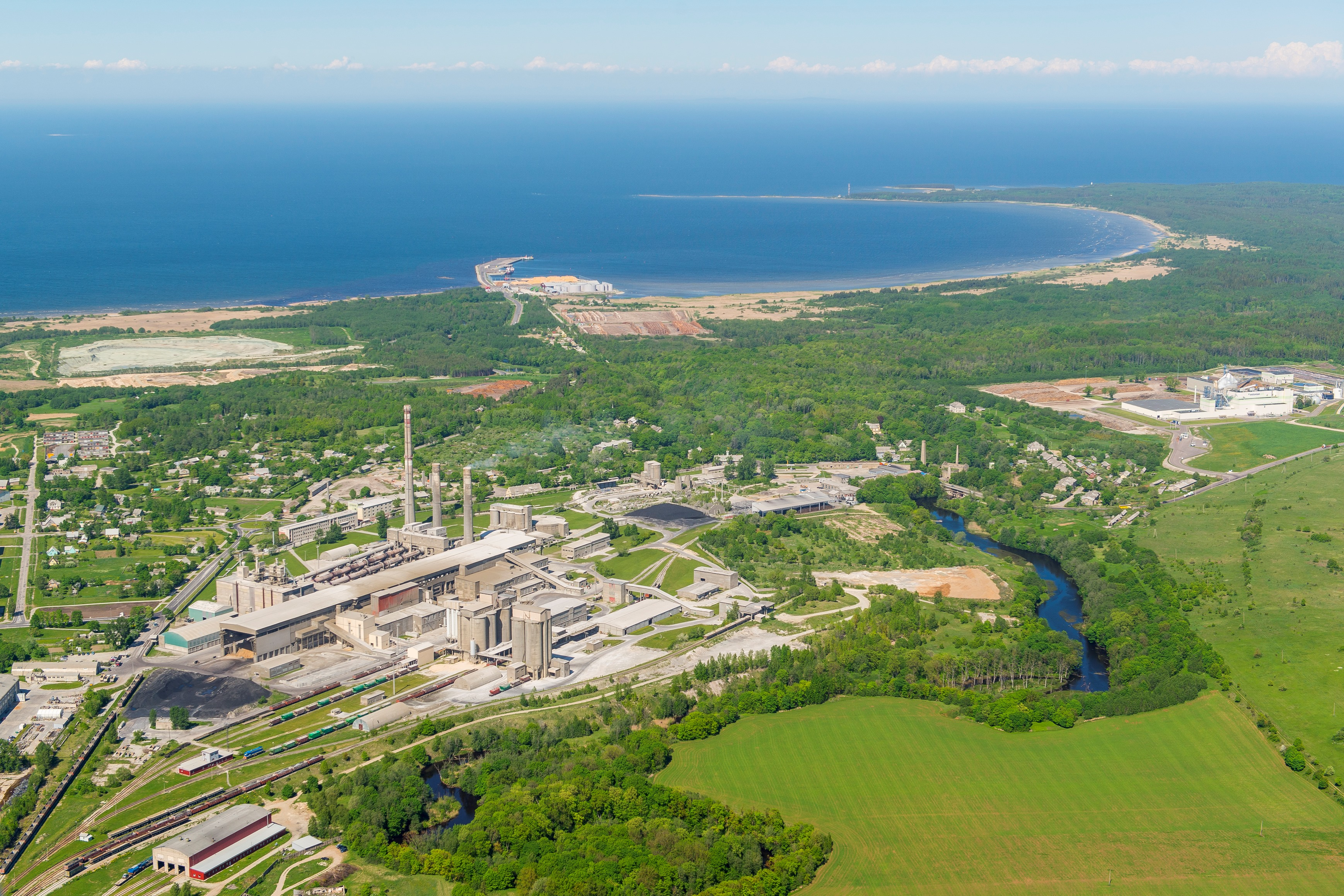
Kunda Nordic Cement factory and Kunda Bay

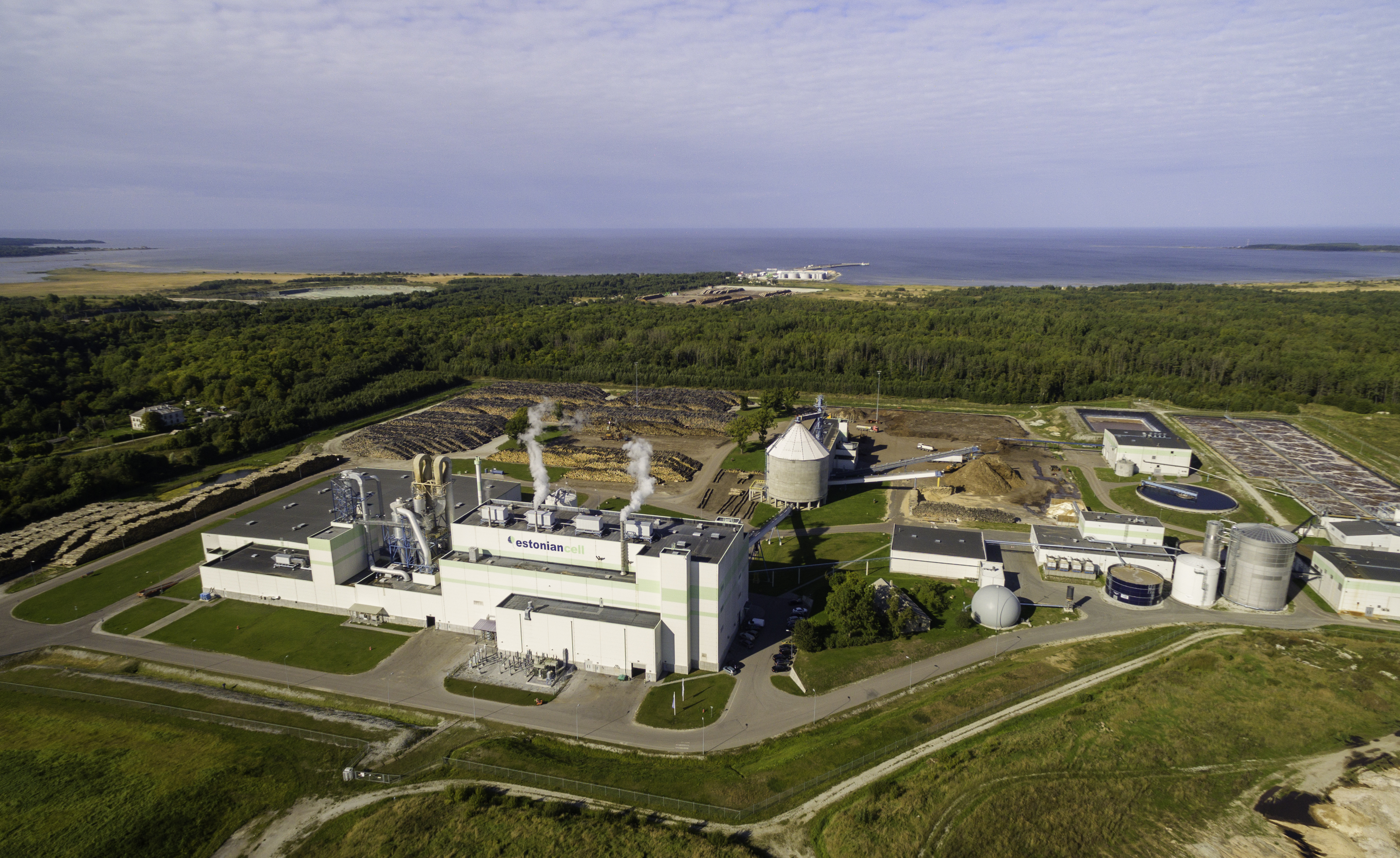
Estonian Cell production buildings

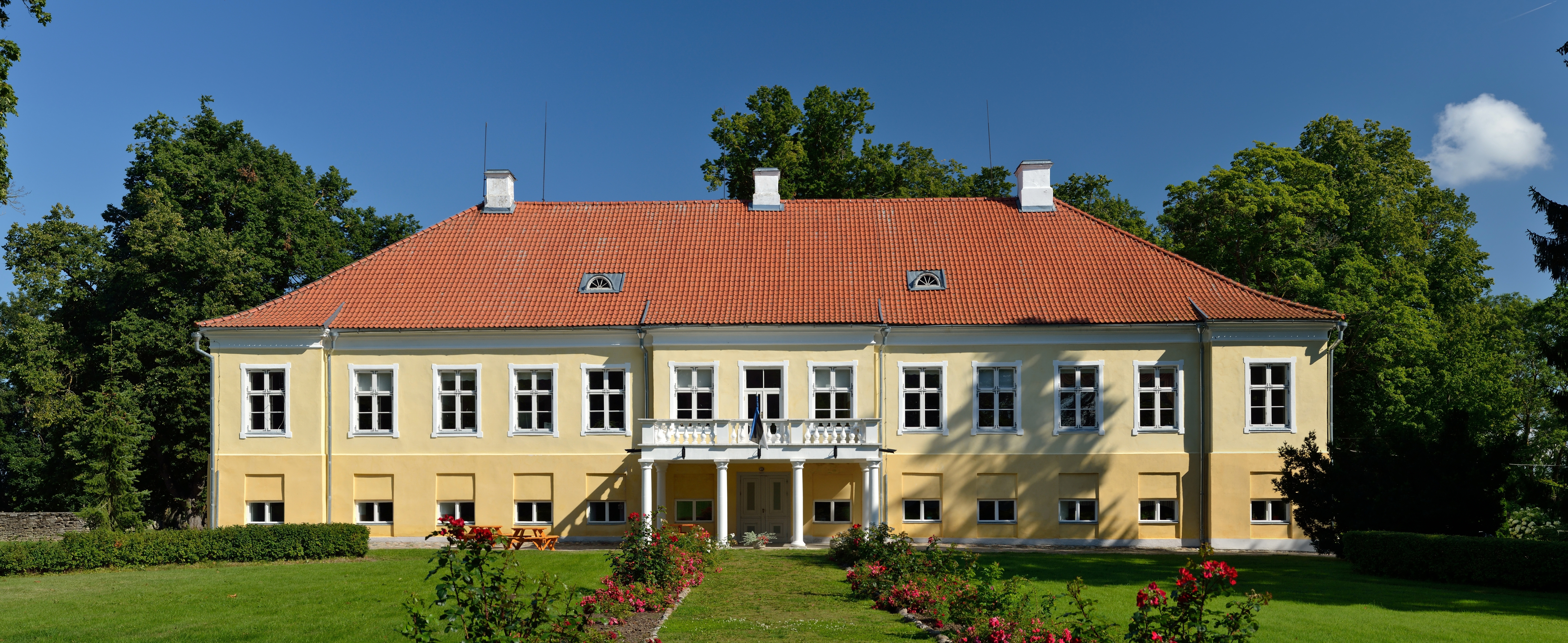
Vasta manor

== Notable people ==
- Kongla Ann (died 1640), woman from Pada, she was executed for witchcraft and werewolfery.
- Magnus Gustav von Essen (1759–1813), Baltic German lieutenant general from Kalvi Manor, Governor of Riga
- Johannes Käbin (1905–1999), politician from Kalvi who led the Communist Party of Estonia from 1950 to 1978.
- Sulev Oll (born 1964), journalist, sports historian and poet from Aseri
