= Varudi =

Village in Estonia

- Village
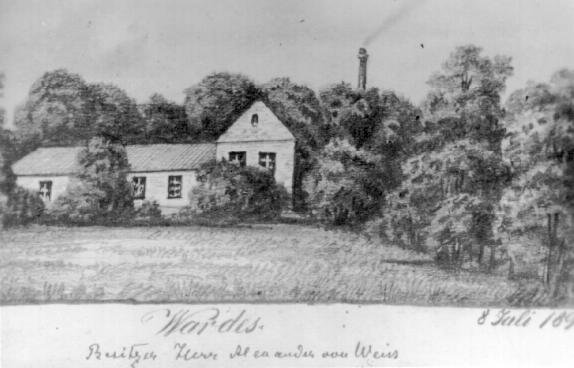
- Varudi Manor in 1894.

- Location in Estonia
- Coordinates: 59°25′18″N 26°38′45″E
- Country: Estonia
- County: Lääne-Viru County
- Municipality: Viru-Nigula Parish

Population (01.01.2011)
  - Total: 17

Varudi is a village in Viru-Nigula Parish, Lääne-Viru County, in northeastern Estonia. It has a population of 17 (as of 1 January 2011).
