= Steven Béla Várdy =

American historian

Steven Béla Várdy (July 3, 1935 – July 23, 2018) was McAnulty Distinguished Professor of European History at Duquesne University, Pittsburgh, Pennsylvania.

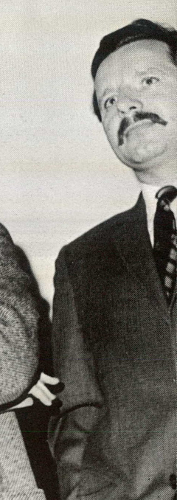
Steven Béla Várdy, circa 1968

Várdy was director of Duquesne University History Forum, and former chairman of its Department of History. He was an invited member of the International P.E.N.(1985), president of the Institute of German American Relations (1995), and a member of the Hungarian Academy of Sciences (2004, 2010).

He was the author, co-author, or co-editor of nearly two dozen books and over six-hundred articles, essays, and reviews. His most recent books included:

- Historical Dictionary of Hungary (1997),
- Hungarians in the New World [Magyarok az Újvilágban] (2000),
- Ethnic Cleansing in Twentieth-Century Europe (2003),
- Struggles in the New World [Újvilági küzdelmek] (2005),
- Stalin’s Gulag: The Hungarian Experience (2007),
- Hungarians in the Slave Labor Camps of the Gulag [Magyarok a Gulág rabszolgatáboraiban] (2007),
- German Contributions to Western Civilization (2009),
- Hungarian Americans in the Current of History (2010)

the last six co-authored or co-edited with Ágnes Huszár Várdy.

Várdy was the recipient of

- Duquesne University's “Presidential Award for Excellence in Scholarship” (1984), Hungary's “Berzsenyi-Prize” (1992),
- Árpád Academy's “Gold Medal” (1997),
- “Officer’s Cross” awarded by the president of the Republic of Hungary (2001),
- “Pro Libertate Award” of the Rákóczi Foundation (2005)
- Gold Medal of the Hungarian Revolutionary Committee (2006)
- Honorary Doctorates from King Louis the Great University (2007), and the University of Miskolc (2010) in Hungary.

In 2000 his former students and colleagues on two continents honored him with a Festschrift (Commemorative Volume) titled Hungary's Historical Legacies: Studies in Honor of Steven Bela Várdy This was repeated in 2012, when mostly other students and colleagues honored him and his wife (his scholarly collaborator) with another Festschrift. Entitled Hungary Through the Centuries: Studies in Honor of Professors Steven Béla Várdy and Agnes Huszár Várdy, this book was edited by Professor Richard P. Mulcahy of the University of Pittsburgh, with the collaboration of Drs. János Angi and Tibor Glant of the University of Debrecen in Hungary. This book was introduced by one of his most distinguished former students, Air Force General Michael Hayden, former head of the National Security Agency and the CIA.

Already a Plenary Member of the Hungarian Academy of Sciences since 2004, in 2010 he was elected a regular External Member of the same academy.

Várdy was involved in two major research projects dealing with the Soviet Gulag slave labor camps, and with the post-World War II political emigration from Hungary to the United States. When writing in Hungarian, he writes under the name of “Várdy Béla.”
