= Oru, Lääne-Viru County =

Village in Estonia

Coordinates: 59°26′49″N 26°48′24″E

Oru
- Village
- Interactive map of Oru
- Country: Estonia
- County: Lääne-Viru County
- Parish: Viru-Nigula Parish
- Time zone: UTC+2 (EET)
  - Summer (DST): UTC+3 (EEST)

Oru is a village in Viru-Nigula Parish, Lääne-Viru County in northeastern Estonia.
