= Vasta (surname) =

Vasta is a surname. Notable people with the surname include:

- Angelo Vasta (1941–2021), Australian former jurist
- Joe Vasta, American lacrosse player
- Ross Vasta (born 1966), Australian politician
