= Rannu, Lääne-Viru County =

Village in Estonia

Coordinates: 59°25′55″N 26°51′16″E

Rannu
- Village
- Interactive map of Rannu
- Country: Estonia
- County: Lääne-Viru County
- Parish: Viru-Nigula Parish
- Time zone: UTC+2 (EET)
  - Summer (DST): UTC+3 (EEST)

Rannu is a village in Viru-Nigula Parish, Lääne-Viru County in northeastern Estonia.
