= Vasta, Estonia =

Village in Estonia

Vasta
- Village
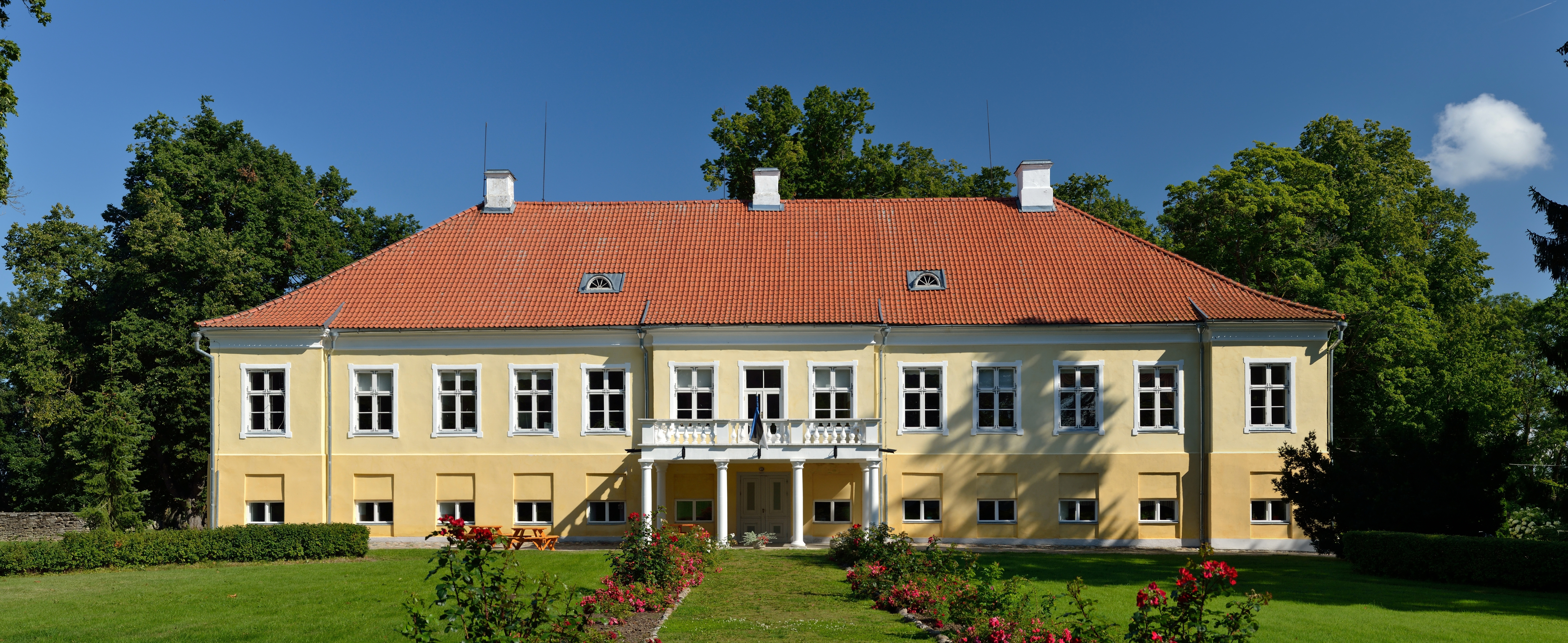
- Vasta manor main building in 2012

- Location in Estonia
- Coordinates: 59°27′23″N 26°41′30″E
- Country: Estonia
- County: Lääne-Viru County
- Municipality: Viru-Nigula Parish

Population (01.01.2011)
  - Total: 47

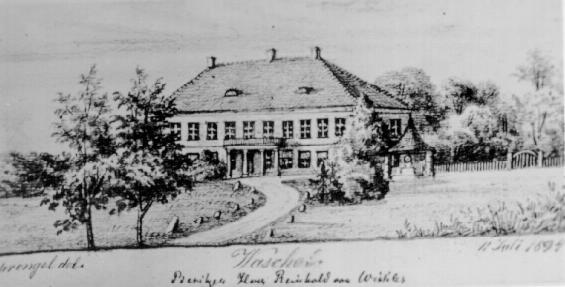
Vasta Manor in 1894

Vasta is a village in Viru-Nigula Parish, Lääne-Viru County, in northeastern Estonia. It has a population of 47 (as of 1 January 2011).
