= Aseri =

Borough in Estonia

- Small borough
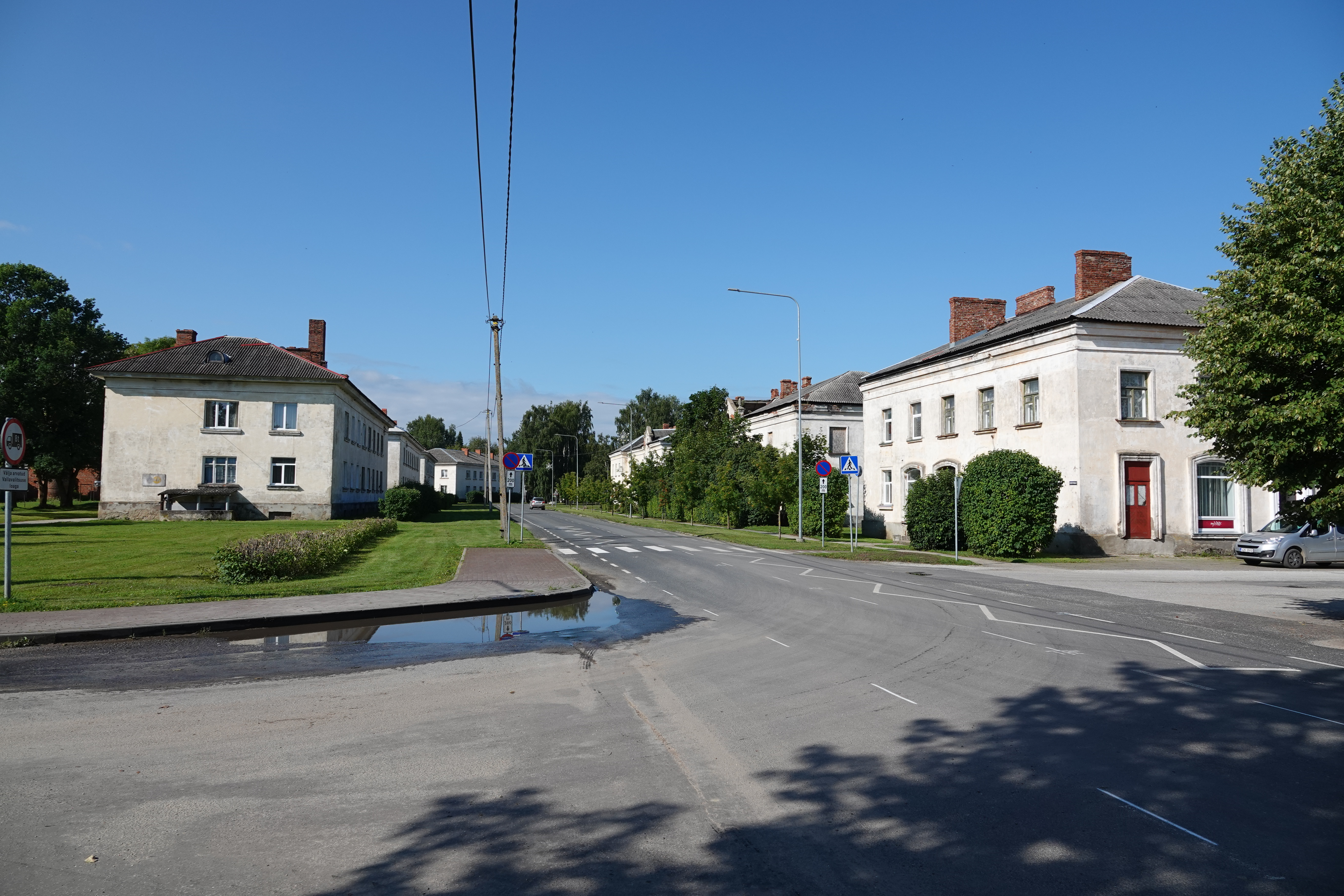
- The main street in Aseri

- Location in Estonia
- Coordinates: 59°27′05″N 26°51′55″E
- Country: Estonia
- County: Lääne-Viru County
- Municipality: Viru-Nigula Parish

Population (2011 Census)
  - Total: 1,439

Aseri (German: Asserien) is a small borough (Estonian: alevik) in Viru-Nigula Parish, Lääne-Viru County, in northeastern Estonia. As of the 2011 census, the settlement's population was 1,439, of which the Estonians were 506 (35.2%).

There is a building materials factory in Aseri.

A 3,200-year-old bronze ax has been found on the beach of Meriküla, only four Late Bronze Age axes have been found in Estonia so far. Aseri is named after the Aseri manor, which was first mentioned in 1367 under the name Asserien, the manor belonged to the parish of Lüganuse, and in the 16th century these areas were merged with the parish of Viru-Nigula.

During the German occupation of Estonia (World War II), the occupiers operated a subcamp of the Vaivara concentration camp, in which Frenchmen, Spaniards, Dutchmen and Jews were subjected to forced labour.

== Notable people ==
- Melanie Kukk (1903–2000), artist
- Sulev Oll (born 1964), journalist

== Gallery ==
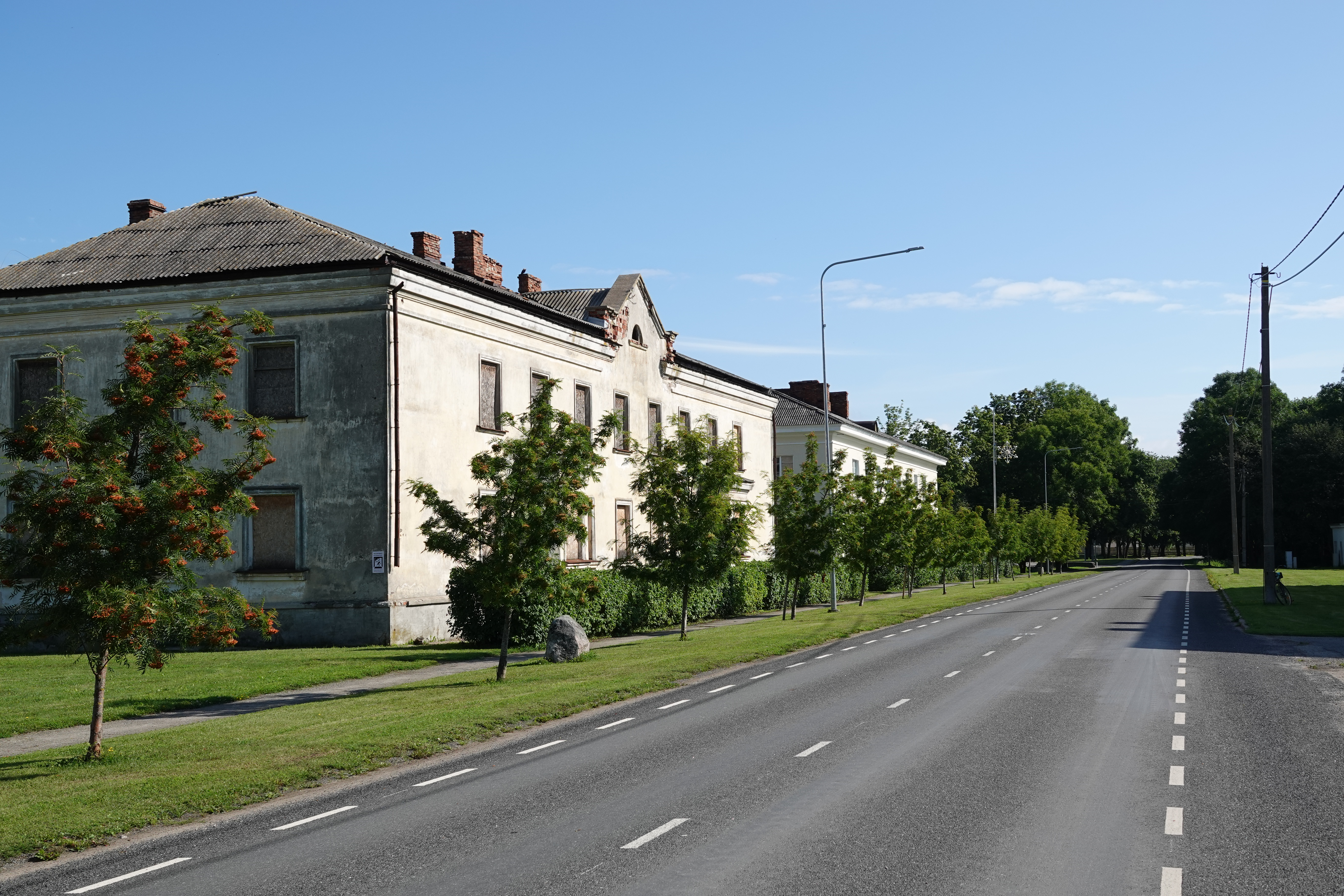

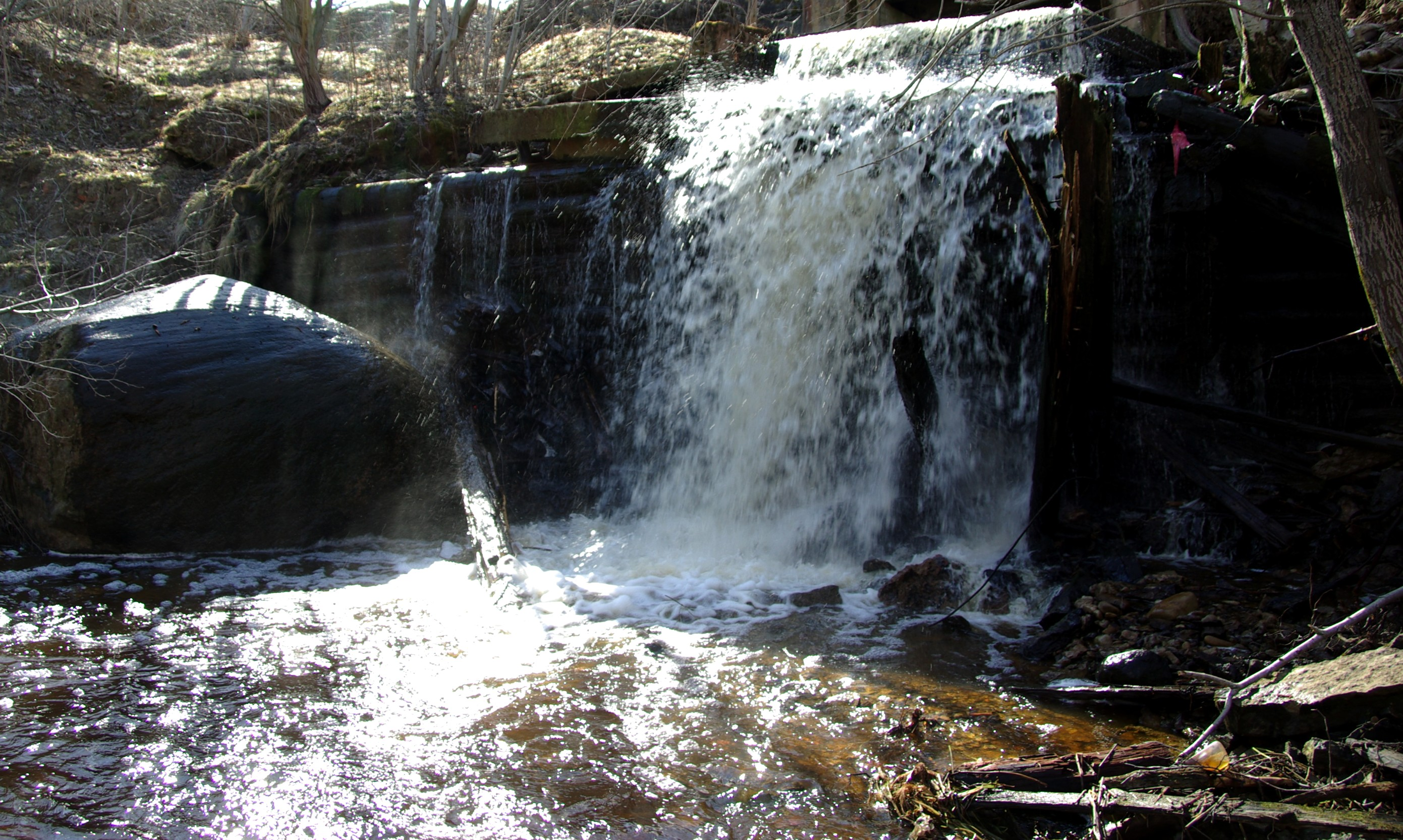

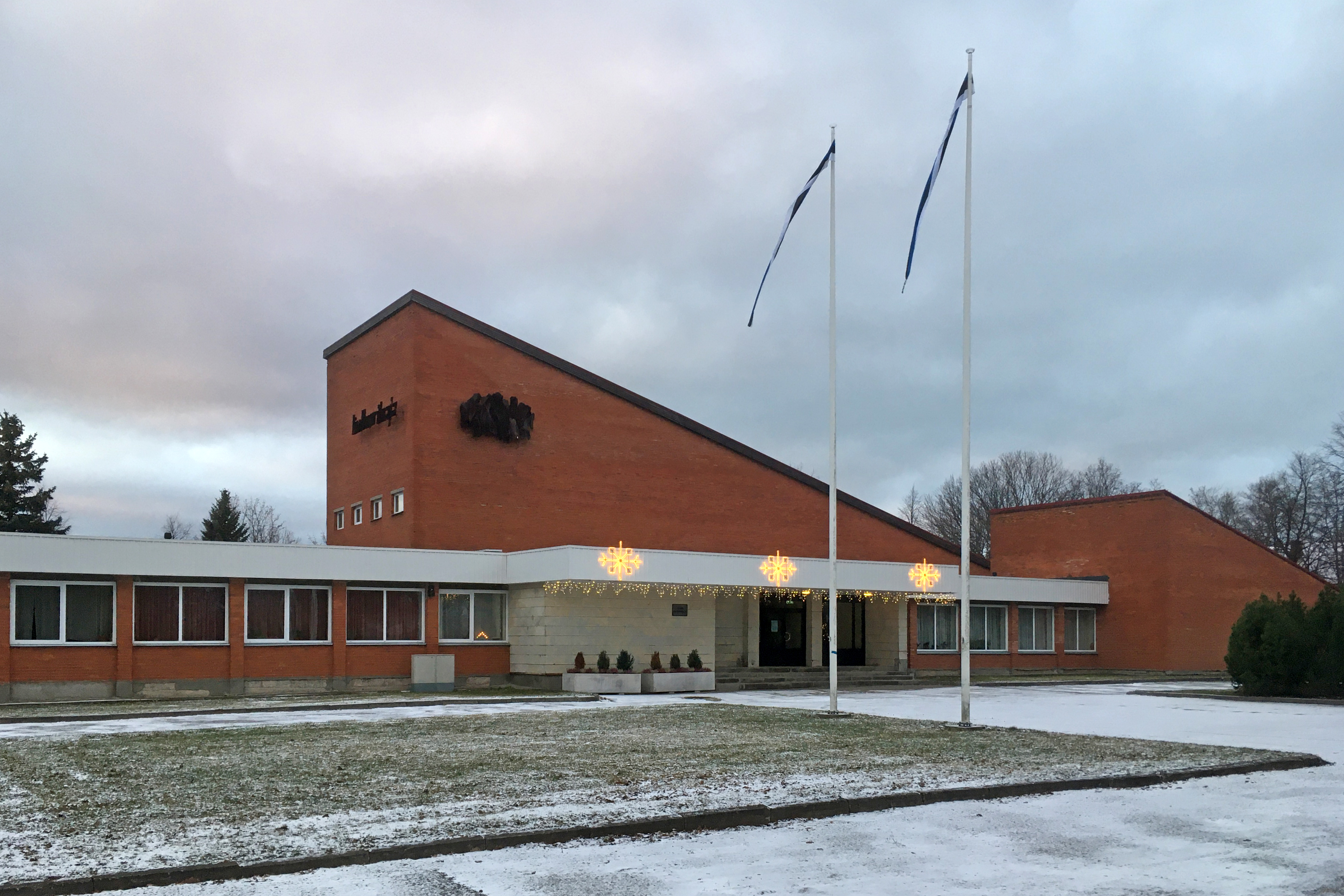
