= Kunda, Estonia =

Town in Estonia

Kunda
- Town
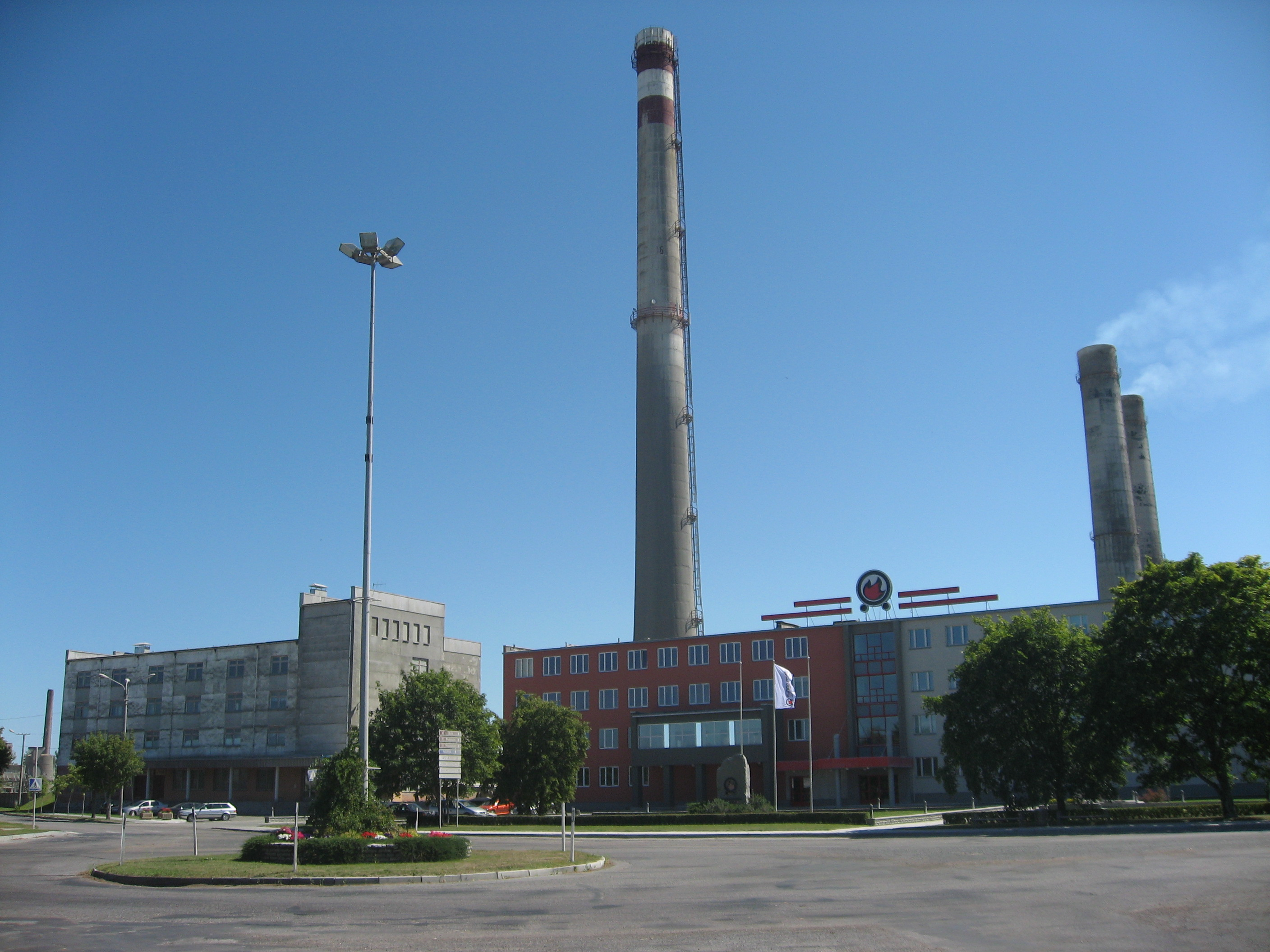
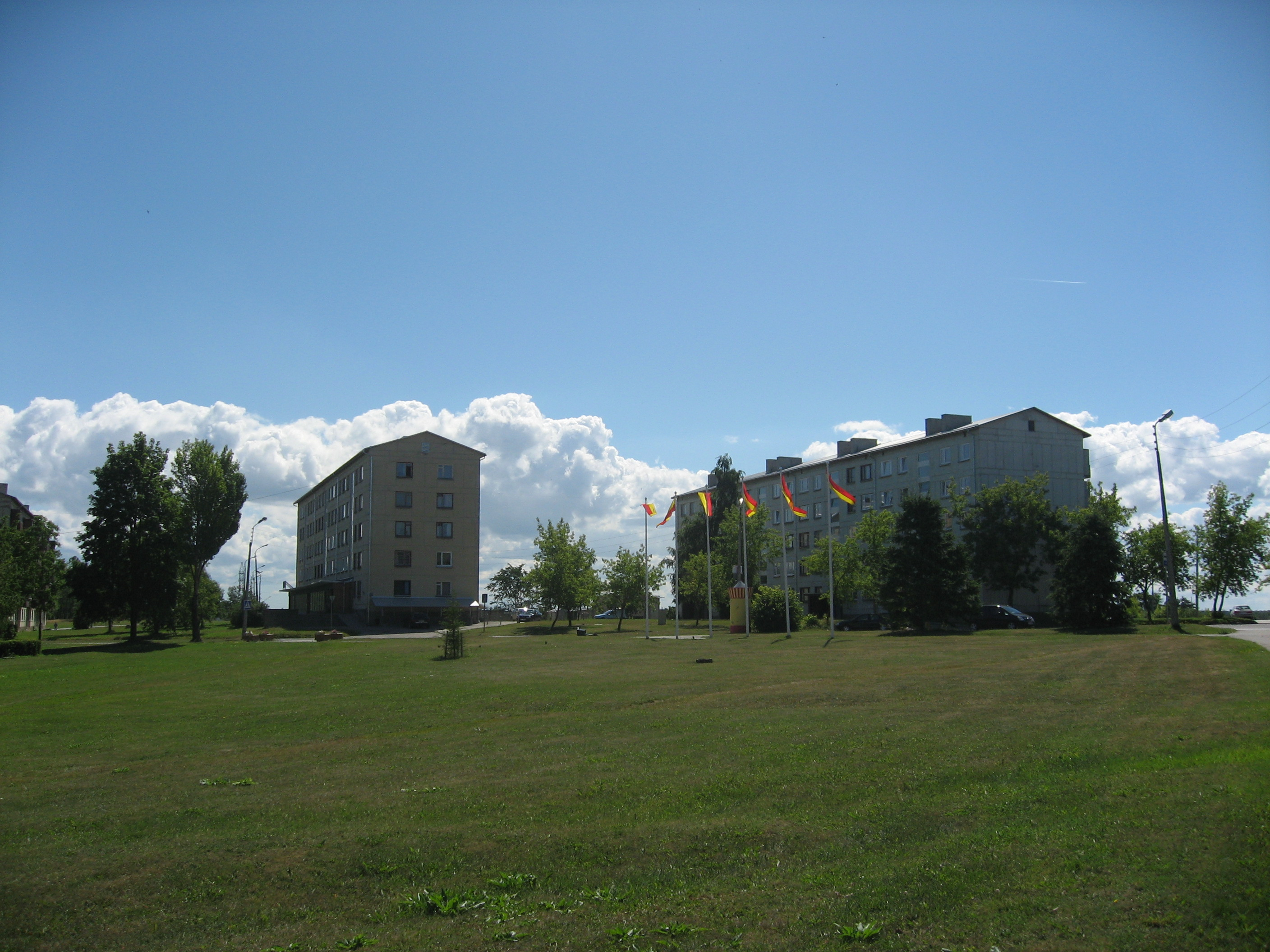
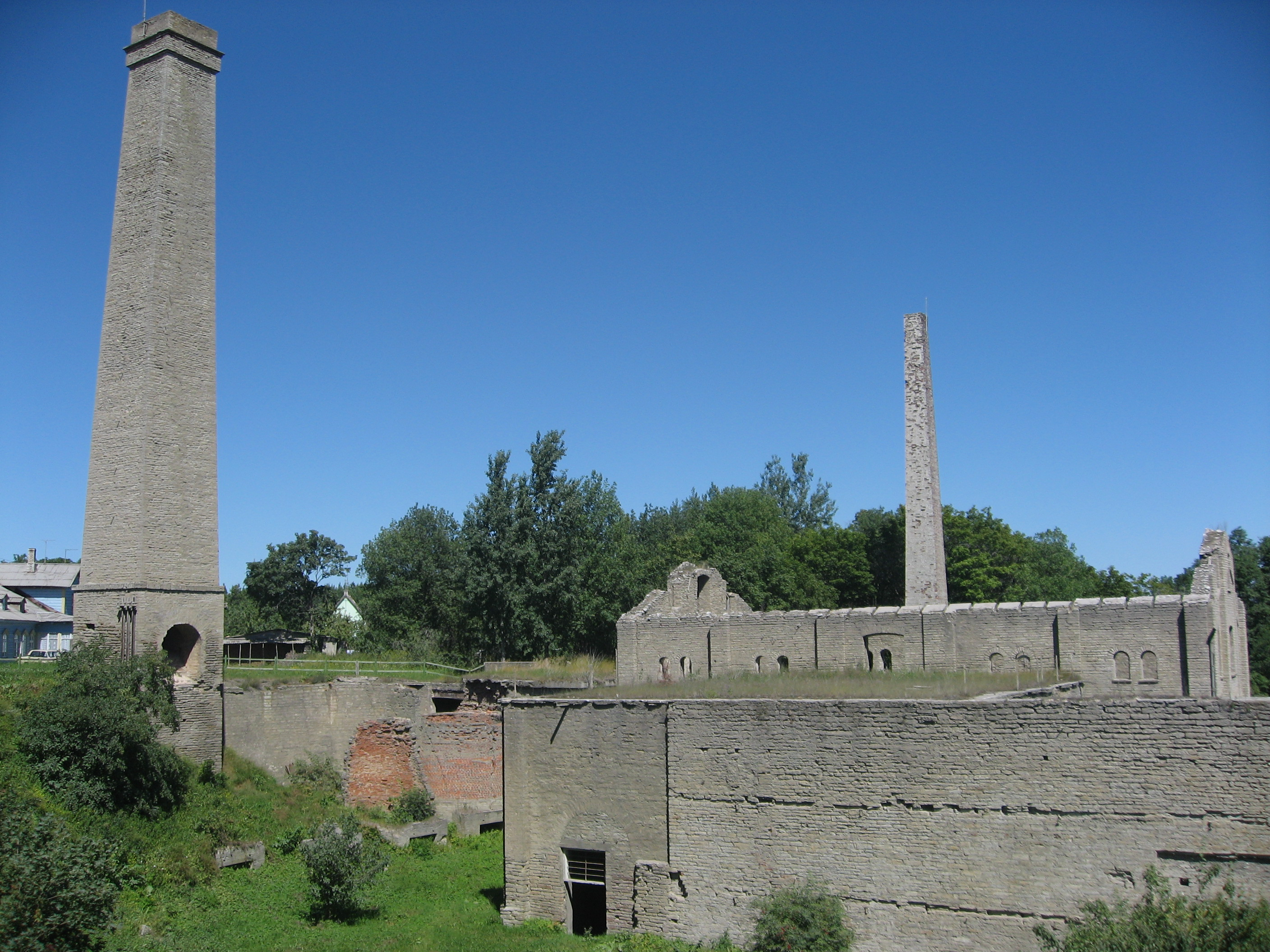
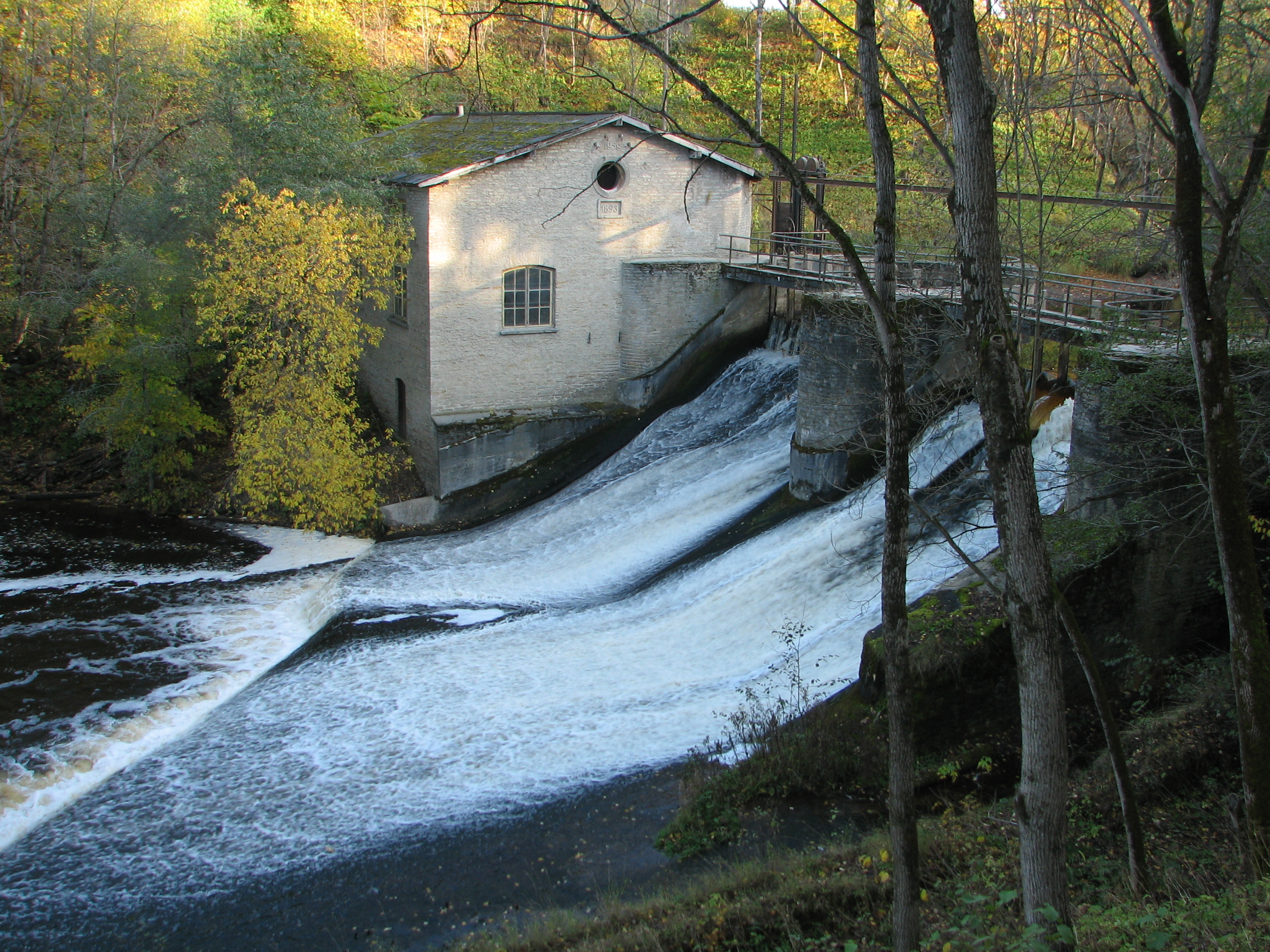
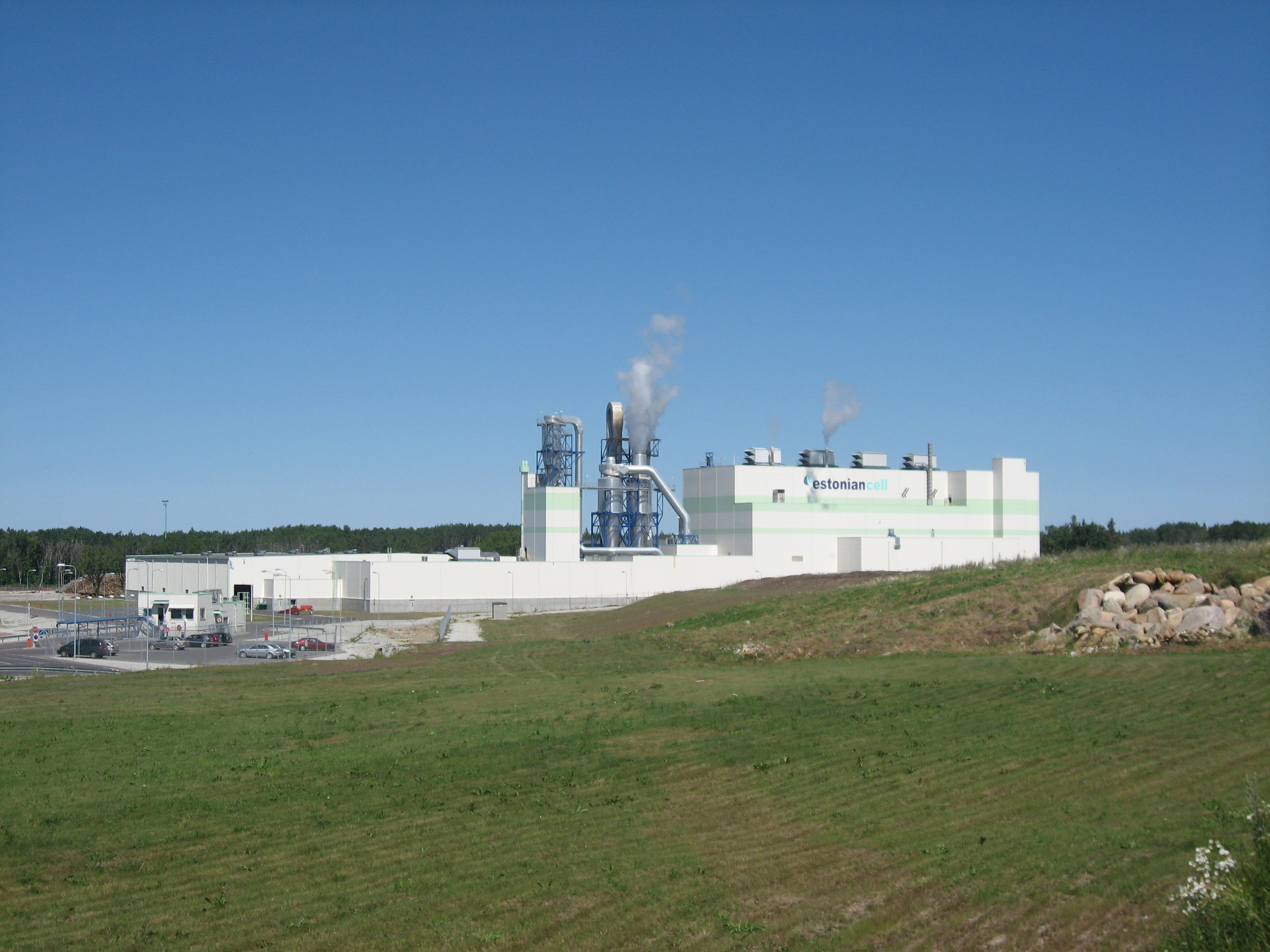
- From left to right, clockwise: A cement factory, apartment buildings, the ruins of an old cement factory, a pulp mill, a hydroelectric power plant

- Location in Estonia Location of Kunda in the Baltic Sea region Location in Europe
- Coordinates: 59°30′N 26°32′E
- Country: Estonia
- County: Lääne-Viru County
- Municipality: Viru-Nigula Parish
- City status: May 1, 1938

Area
  - Total: 9.85 km^{2} (3.80 sq mi)

Population (2026)
  - Total: 2,975
  - Rank: 28th
  - Density: 302/km^{2} (782/sq mi)
- Time zone: UTC+2 (EET)
  - Summer (DST): UTC+3 (EEST)

Kunda is a town in Viru-Nigula Parish, Lääne-Viru County, Estonia, located on the coast of the Gulf of Finland. Kunda is best known for its cement factory, port, and archaeological heritage.

== History ==
Evidence of some of the oldest prehistoric communities in Estonia—hunting, and fishing communities that existed around 6500 BC—were found near Kunda. This settlement gave the name to the Kunda culture.

The first written record of Kunda dates back to 1241, when it was mentioned as a village. In 1443 it was mentioned as a manor.

Kunda was granted official town rights on May 1, 1938.

== Demographics ==
Ethnic composition 1922-2021
Ethnicity	1922		1934		1941		1959		1970		1979		1989		2000		2011		2021	
Ethnicity	amount	%	amount	%	amount	%	amount	%	amount	%	amount	%	amount	%	amount	%	amount	%	amount	%
Estonians	2102	91.0	1728	92.8	1433	97.5	2768	73.3	3400	65.1	2945	61.0	2513	49.9	2283	58.6	2176	63.6	2043	68.2
Russians	97	4.20	77	4.13	25	1.70	-	-	1442	27.6	1468	30.4	2037	40.4	1278	32.8	1041	30.4	802	26.8
Ukrainians	-	-	0	0.00	-	-	-	-	118	2.26	134	2.78	166	3.30	-	-	82	2.40	55	1.84
Belarusians	-	-	-	-	-	-	-	-	95	1.82	92	1.91	83	1.65	-	-	34	0.99	26	0.87
Finns	-	-	9	0.48	2	0.14	-	-	102	1.95	106	2.20	104	2.06	-	-	37	1.08	26	0.87
Jews	0	0.00	0	0.00	0	0.00	-	-	3	0.06	2	0.04	2	0.04	-	-	2	0.06	0	0.00
Latvians	-	-	0	0.00	1	0.07	-	-	2	0.04	11	0.23	4	0.08	-	-	5	0.15	5	0.17
Germans	73	3.16	33	1.77	-	-	-	-	-	-	4	0.08	7	0.14	-	-	7	0.20	3	0.10
Tatars	-	-	0	0.00	-	-	-	-	-	-	10	0.21	13	0.26	-	-	1	0.03	3	0.10
Poles	-	-	1	0.05	0	0.00	-	-	-	-	14	0.29	13	0.26	-	-	6	0.18	5	0.17
Lithuanians	-	-	0	0.00	0	0.00	-	-	8	0.15	7	0.14	14	0.28	-	-	11	0.32	7	0.23
unknown	1	0.04	0	0.00	3	0.20	0	0.00	0	0.00	0	0.00	0	0.00	12	0.31	1	0.03	3	0.10
other	37	1.60	15	0.81	5	0.34	1008	26.7	56	1.07	35	0.72	81	1.61	326	8.36	19	0.56	21	0.70
Total	2310	100	1863	100	1469	100	3776	100	5226	100	4828	100	5037	100	3899	100	3422	100	2997	100.08

== International relations ==
=== Twin towns — Sister cities ===
The former municipality of Kunda (until 2017) was twinned with:

- Gdynia, Poland

== Climate ==
Climate data for Kunda, Estonia (normals 1991–2020, extremes 1849–present)
Month	Jan	Feb	Mar	Apr	May	Jun	Jul	Aug	Sep	Oct	Nov	Dec	Year
Record high °C (°F)	9.6 (49.3)	11.1 (52.0)	15.8 (60.4)	27.6 (81.7)	33.1 (91.6)	34.1 (93.4)	33.9 (93.0)	34.4 (93.9)	29.0 (84.2)	21.2 (70.2)	13.7 (56.7)	11.8 (53.2)	34.4 (93.9)
Mean daily maximum °C (°F)	−1 (30)	−1.2 (29.8)	2.6 (36.7)	8.8 (47.8)	14.7 (58.5)	18.9 (66.0)	21.8 (71.2)	20.9 (69.6)	16.1 (61.0)	9.5 (49.1)	4.0 (39.2)	0.9 (33.6)	9.7 (49.5)
Daily mean °C (°F)	−3.3 (26.1)	−4.0 (24.8)	−0.8 (30.6)	4.4 (39.9)	9.8 (49.6)	14.4 (57.9)	17.5 (63.5)	16.5 (61.7)	12.2 (54.0)	6.7 (44.1)	1.9 (35.4)	−1.1 (30.0)	6.2 (43.2)
Mean daily minimum °C (°F)	−5.7 (21.7)	−6.7 (19.9)	−4 (25)	0.8 (33.4)	5.3 (41.5)	10.1 (50.2)	13.2 (55.8)	12.4 (54.3)	8.6 (47.5)	4.0 (39.2)	−0.2 (31.6)	−3.2 (26.2)	2.9 (37.2)
Record low °C (°F)	−33.1 (−27.6)	−34.9 (−30.8)	−27.7 (−17.9)	−19 (−2)	−5.3 (22.5)	−0.2 (31.6)	2.9 (37.2)	2.7 (36.9)	−3.4 (25.9)	−10.6 (12.9)	−19.7 (−3.5)	−34.9 (−30.8)	−34.9 (−30.8)
Average precipitation mm (inches)	38 (1.5)	29 (1.1)	27 (1.1)	29 (1.1)	41 (1.6)	68 (2.7)	61 (2.4)	76 (3.0)	54 (2.1)	61 (2.4)	52 (2.0)	38 (1.5)	573 (22.6)
Average precipitation days (≥ 1.0 mm)	10.0	7.5	7.0	6.5	6.3	9.5	8.6	10.5	9.3	11.9	10.5	10.1	107.7
Average relative humidity (%)	87	85	80	75	72	76	78	80	81	83	86	86	81
Source 1: Estonian Weather Service
Source 2: NOAA/NCEI (precipitation day, 1991-2020)

== Notable people ==
- Michael Wittlich (1866–1933), chemist and professor
- Jüri Parijõgi (1892–1941), writer and scholar
- Ernst Öpik (1893–1985), astronomer and astrophysicist, worked on the Yarkovsky effect
- Knudåge Riisager (1897–1974), composer, son of expatriate Danish parents, his father ran a cement factory.
- Armin Öpik (1898–1983), paleontologist
- Argo Aadli (born 1980), theatre and film actor
