= Hary (name) =

Hary or Háry may refer to the following people

Given name

- Hary Suharyadi (born 1965), Indonesian tennis player
- Hary Susanto (born 1975), Indonesian para badminton player
- Hary Tanoesoedibjo (born 1965), Indonesian businessman

Surname

- Armin Hary (born 1937), German sprinter
- László Háry (1890–1953), Commander of the Hungarian Air Force
- Maryan Hary (born 1980), French road bicycle racer
