= Michael Wittlich =

Estonian chemist

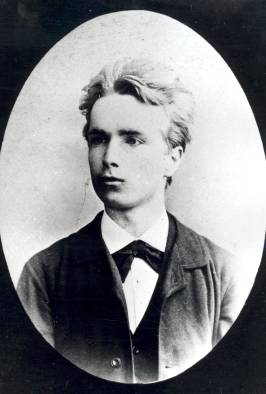
Michael Wittlich

Michael Wittlich (also Mihkel Vitsut; 11 October 1866 – 6 February 1933) was an Estonian chemist and professor. He acted as the professor for Technical Chemistry at Tartu University.

Wittlich was born in Kunda. In 1890 he graduated from Riga Polytechnical Institute with an engineer's diploma. Following this he worked for a number of years at many factories within Tallinn, he began his teaching career in Riga Polytechnic in 1905, and obtained professorship in Chemical Technology there in 1909.

From 1909 to 1918 he taught as a professor of Chemical Technology at Riga Polytechnical Institute, and from 1919 to 1932 at Tartu University.

In 1925 (with Paul Kogermann) he established the oil shale laboratory at Tartu University. He researched also the chemical structure of peat, technologies related to sugar and starch industries.

== Works ==
- 1927: Valitud peatükid tehnoloogiast. Tartu [first Estonian-language textbook about chemical technology]
