= Jüri Parijõgi =

Estonian writer

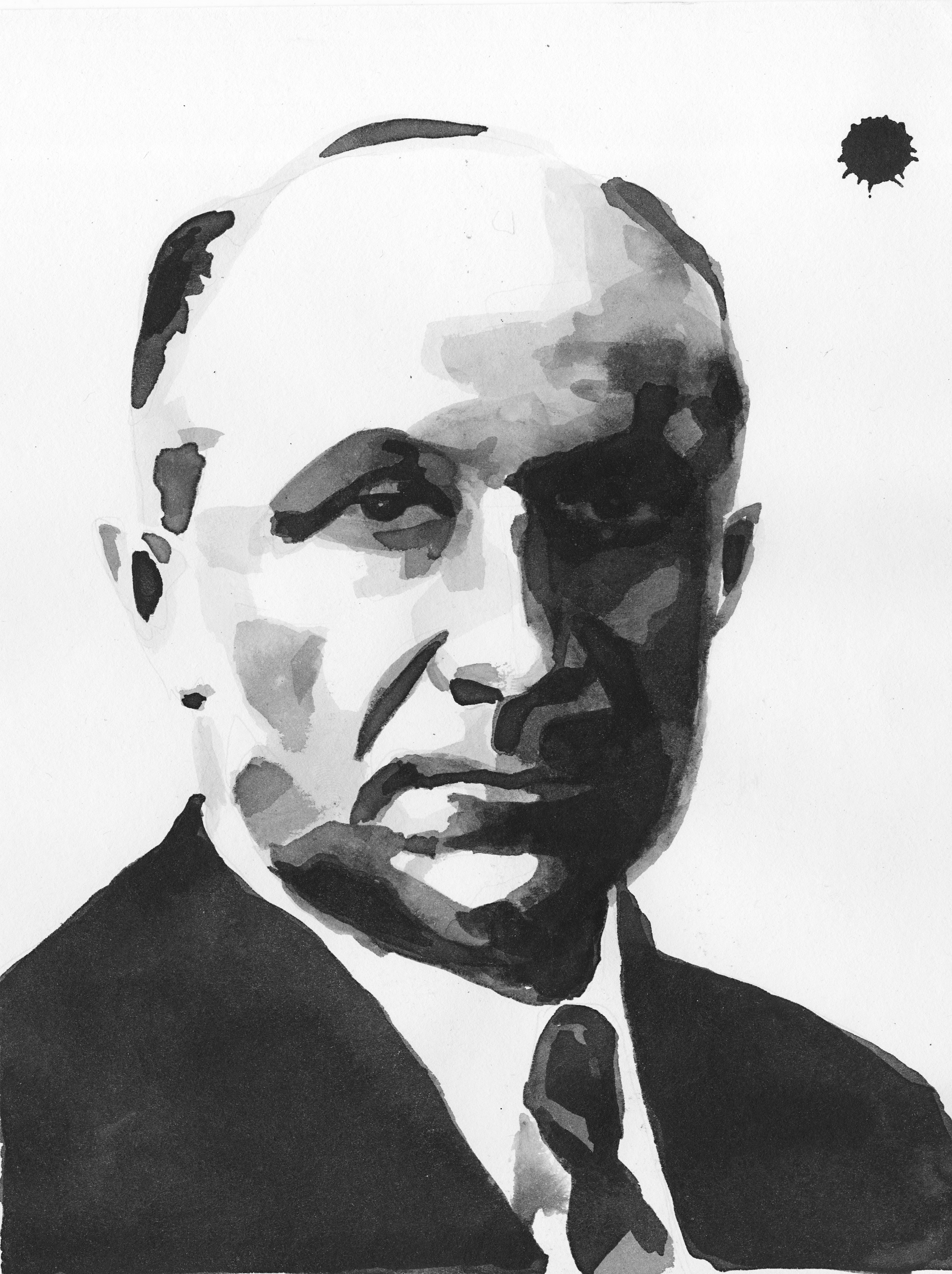
Jüri Parijõgi

Jüri Parijõgi (until 1935 Jüri Parinbak or Jüri Parinbach; 2 September 1892 – 9 July 1941) was an Estonian children's writer and teacher. He is regarded as the first Estonian writer who wrote almost exclusively for children and young people.

He took part in World War I and in the Estonian War of Independence.

From 1929 to 1931 he studied in the Faculty of Philosophy at University of Tartu.

He died on 9 July 1941 in Tartu Prison, being a victim of the mass murder by the NKVD.

== Works ==
- 1926: story "Semendivabrik" ('Cement Factory')
- 1930: story "Jaksuküla poisid" ('The Jaksuküla Boys')
- 1937: story "Teraspoiss" ('Steel Boy')
