= 1990 in Iceland =

- Decades: 1970s; 1980s; 1990s; 2000s; 2010s
- See also: Other events of 1990; Timeline of Icelandic history

The following lists events that happened in 1990 in Iceland.

== Incumbents ==
- President – Vigdís Finnbogadóttir
- Prime Minister – Steingrímur Hermannsson

== Events ==
- 1 January – The Fishery Management Act (Act 38/1990) takes effect, making permanent, fully transferable individual quotas the legal basis of Iceland's fisheries regime.

=== Cultural and Festival Events ===
Various local and traditional events such as Bolludagur (Bun Day), Sprengidagur (Bursting Day), and Öskudagur (Ash Wednesday)

The Reykjavik Arts Festival

Sjómannadagur (Festival of the Sea)

Icelandic Independence DayThe Oddi Association (Oddafélagið) was established in Reijavik.

== Births ==
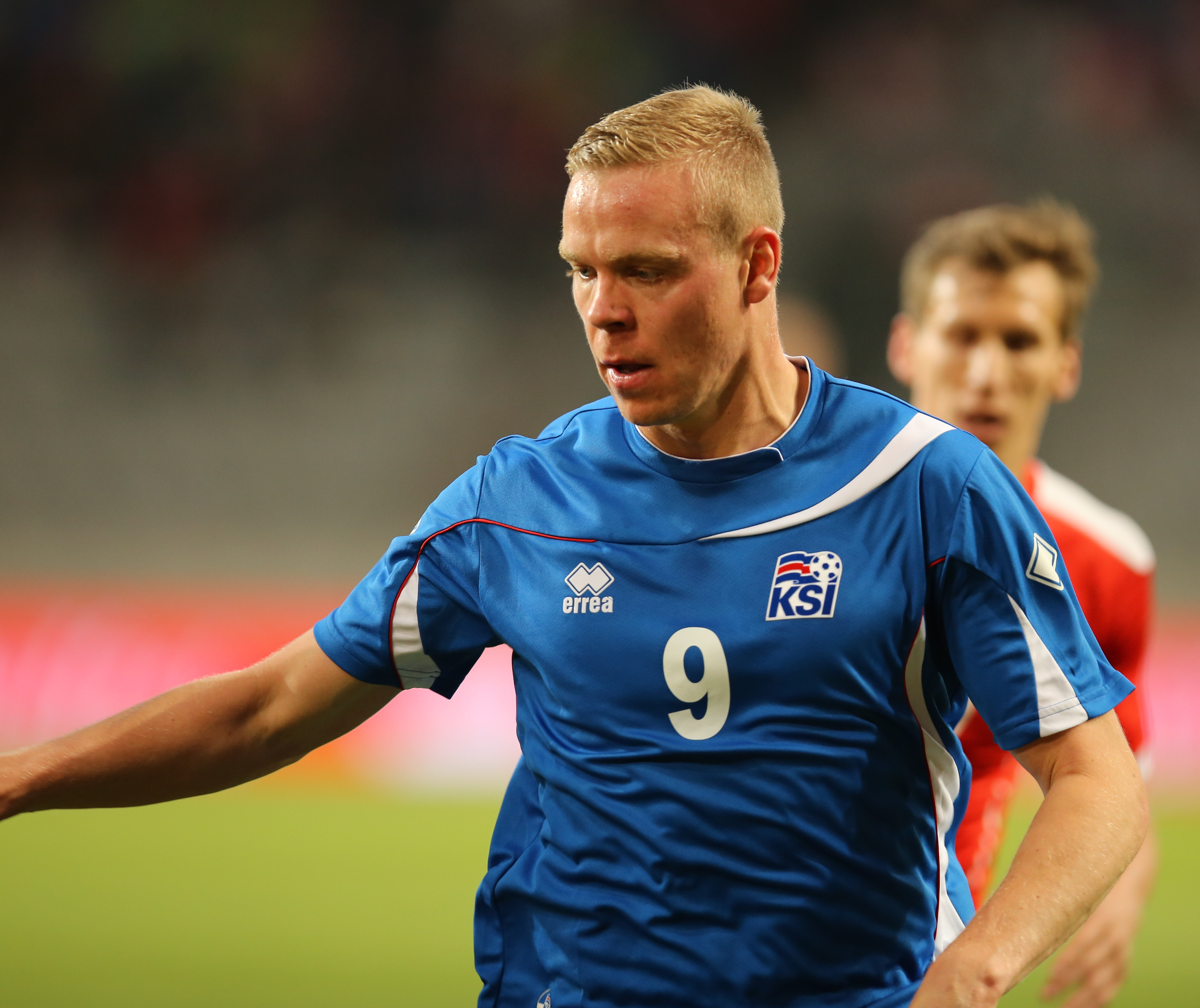
Kolbeinn Sigþórsson

- January 3 – Sunneva Einarsdóttir, handball player.
- February 4 – Karen Knútsdóttir, handball player.
- February 5 – Ásta Guðrún Helgadóttir, politician
- March 14 – Kolbeinn Sigþórsson, footballer.
- March 30 – Stella Sigurðardóttir, handball player
- April 29 – Kristinn Steindórsson, footballer.
- May 13 – Ólafur Guðmundsson, handball player
- May 19 – Stefán Rafn Sigurmannsson, handball player
- May 29 – Björn Daníel Sverrisson, footballer
- August 4 – Kristinn Jónsson, footballer
- September 29 – Sara Björk Gunnarsdóttir, footballer
- October 16 – Jóhanna Guðrún Jónsdóttir, singer.
- October 27 – Jóhann Berg Guðmundsson, footballer

== Deaths ==
- September 1
  - Geir Hallgrímsson, politician (b. 1925).
  - Stefán Kristjánsson, alpine skier (b. 1924).
