= 2011 in Iceland =

- Decades: 1990s; 2000s; 2010s; 2020s
- See also: Other events of 2011; Timeline of Icelandic history

The following lists events that happened in 2011 in Iceland.

== Incumbents ==
- President – Ólafur Ragnar Grímsson
- Prime Minister – Jóhanna Sigurðardóttir

== Politics ==
- Icelandic loan guarantees referendum, 2011

== Deaths ==
- 9 March – Valgerður Hafstað, 80, painter
