= 2008 in Iceland =

- Decades: 1980s; 1990s; 2000s; 2010s; 2020s
- See also: Other events of 2008; Timeline of Icelandic history

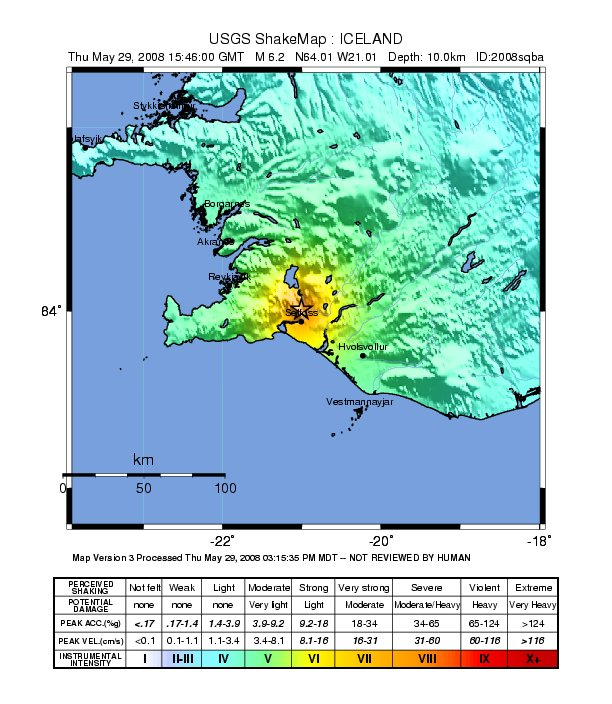
Map of the 2008 Iceland earthquake

The following lists events that happened in 2008 in Iceland.

== Incumbents ==
- President – Ólafur Ragnar Grímsson
- Prime Minister – Geir Haarde

== Events ==
=== May ===
- May 29 – A strong earthquake measuring 6.1 on the Richter scale strikes Iceland near the town of Selfoss.

=== September ===
- September 29 – The government of Iceland takes control of the country's number three bank, the struggling Glitnir Bank.

=== October ===
- October 8 – Iceland's Financial Supervisory Authority takes control of troubled Landsbanki Bank.
- October 9 – Kaupthing Bank, Iceland's largest bank, is nationalized by the country's Financial Supervisory Authority.
- October 21 – Iceland's Kaupthing Bank fails to pay interest to its 50-billion-yen (US$493 million) bondholders in Japan.
- October 29 – Danish-based low-cost carrier Sterling Airlines files for bankruptcy and stops all passenger flights after its cash-strapped Icelandic investors were unable keep the company afloat.

=== November ===
- November 19 – The International Monetary Fund approves a US$2.1 billion rescue package for Iceland following its financial crisis.

== Deaths ==
- 28 August – Sigurbjörn Einarsson, the tenth Bishop of Iceland, served in office in 1959-1981 (b. 1911)
- 9 June – Ólafur Skúlason, the twelfth Bishop of Iceland, served in office in 1989-1997 (b. 1929)
