= 2001 in Iceland =

- Decades: 1980s; 1990s; 2000s; 2010s; 2020s
- See also: Other events of 2001; Timeline of Icelandic history

The following lists events that happened in 2001 in Iceland.

== Incumbents ==
- President – Ólafur Ragnar Grímsson
- Prime Minister – Davíð Oddsson

== Events ==
- 17 February – Kristján Gíslason and Gunnar Ólason won Iceland’s Eurovision selection with “Birta”.
- 25 March – Iceland began fully implementing the Schengen Agreement, removing border controls with other participating countries.
- 27 March – The Government of Iceland and the Central Bank of Iceland adopted an inflation-targeting framework.
- May – A new Central Bank Act came into effect, giving the Central Bank of Iceland greater independence.
- 12 May – Two Tricky represented Iceland at the Eurovision Song Contest and finished joint last with three points.
- 8 June - Iceland announced its intention to rejoin the International Whaling Commission. Its application was later rejected, but Iceland was allowed to participate as an observer.
- 1 July – Iceland’s Act on Interest and Price Indexation entered into force.
- 23–27 July – The International Whaling Commission rejected Iceland’s reservation concerning commercial whaling and allowed Iceland to participate as an observer.
- 27 August – Icelandic singer Björk released her fourth studio album, Vespertine.
- 1 September – Iceland defeated the Czech Republic 3–1 in a FIFA World Cup qualifying match.
- 27 September – Iceland’s women’s under-19 football team advanced to the second qualifying round of the European Championship after winning all three group matches.
- 21 December – Iceland’s Film Act No. 137/2001 was enacted.
