= 1996 in Iceland =

- Decades: 1970s; 1980s; 1990s; 2000s; 2010s
- See also: Other events of 1996; Timeline of Icelandic history

The following lists events that happened in 1996 in Iceland.

== Incumbents ==
- President – Vigdís Finnbogadóttir (until 1 August), Ólafur Ragnar Grímsson (starting 1 August)
- Prime Minister – Davíð Oddsson

== Births ==
- 13 January – Aníta Hinriksdóttir, middle-distance runner
