= 2007 in Iceland =

- Decades: 1980s; 1990s; 2000s; 2010s; 2020s
- See also: Other events of 2007; Timeline of Icelandic history

The following lists events that happened in 2007 in Iceland.

== Incumbents ==
- President – Ólafur Ragnar Grímsson
- Prime Minister – Geir Haarde

== Events ==
=== May ===
- May 12 - Parliamentary elections were held.
