= 2014 in Iceland =

- Decades: 1990s; 2000s; 2010s; 2020s
- See also: Other events of 2014; Timeline of Icelandic history

The following lists events that happened in 2014 in Iceland.

== Incumbents ==
- President – Ólafur Ragnar Grímsson
- Prime Minister – Sigmundur Davíð Gunnlaugsson

== Events ==
=== April ===
- April 11 - Iceland supports sanctions against at Russian individuals, including freezing assets and travel bans.

=== May ===
- May 31 - Municipal elections took place.

=== August ===
- August 23 - Iceland issues an aviation alert for the Bárðarbunga volcano, which was expected to release significant amounts of ash.
