= 1992 in Iceland =

- Decades: 1970s; 1980s; 1990s; 2000s; 2010s
- See also: Other events of 1992; Timeline of Icelandic history

The following lists events that happened in 1992 in Iceland.

== Incumbents ==
- President – Vigdís Finnbogadóttir
- Prime Minister – Davíð Oddsson

== Events ==
=== May ===
- The cult movie Remote Control (Sódóma Reykjavík) is released.

=== June ===
- Vigdís Finnbogadóttir is re-elected as President in an uncontested election.

== Births ==
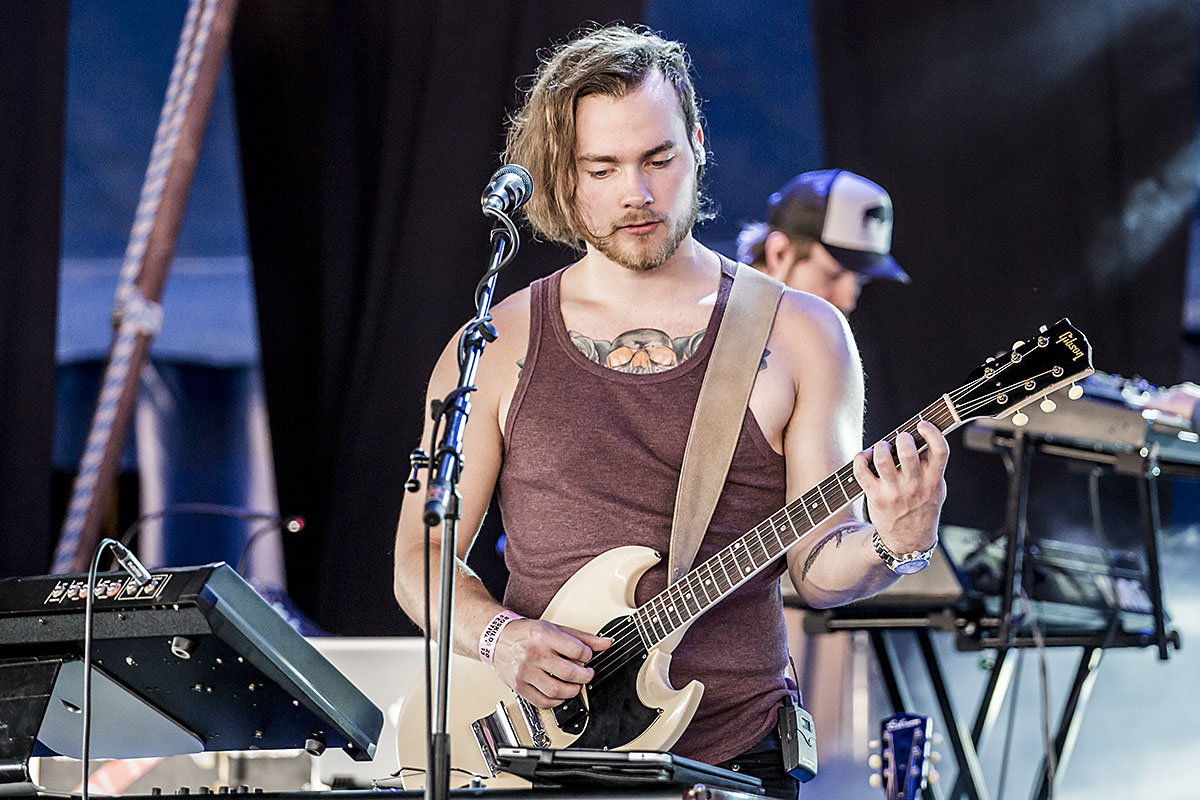
Ásgeir Trausti

- 30 March – Ólafur Karl Finsen, footballer
- 15 April – Guðmundur Þórarinsson, footballer.
- 18 May – Haukur Pálsson, basketball player
- 25 May – Jón Daði Böðvarsson, footballer
- 27 May – Frida Einarsdottir, artistic gymnast
- 31 May – Jóhann Páll Jóhannsson, politician
- 2 June – Þorgerður Anna Atladóttir, handball player
- 1 July – Ásgeir Trausti, musician
- 5 August – Guðmundur Hólmar Helgason, handball player
- 12 August – Arna Ásgrímsdóttir, footballer
- 31 August – Ragna Sigurðardóttir, politician
- 8 October – Agnes Suto, artistic gymnast
- 18 October – Dominiqua Belanyi, artistic gymnast

== Deaths ==
- 1 September – Árni Böðvarsson, educator, grammarian, and dictionary editor (b. 1924)
- 26 December – Sigríður Hagalín, actress (b. 1926)
- 31 December – Kristján Vattnes, athlete (b. 1916).
