= 2012 in Iceland =

- Decades: 1990s; 2000s; 2010s; 2020s
- See also: Other events of 2012; Timeline of Icelandic history

The following lists events that happened in 2012 in Iceland.

== Incumbents ==
- President – Ólafur Ragnar Grímsson
- Prime Minister – Jóhanna Sigurðardóttir

== Politics ==
- 30 June: 2012 Icelandic presidential election, Ólafur Ragnar Grímsson won a recond fifth-term as President of Iceland

== Events ==
- Agnes Sigurðardóttir became the fourteenth Bishop of Iceland, succeeding Karl Sigurbjörnsson in the position. She was the first woman to be elected a Bishop of the Church of Iceland.
