= 2005 in Iceland =

- Decades: 1980s; 1990s; 2000s; 2010s; 2020s
- See also: Other events of 2005; Timeline of Icelandic history

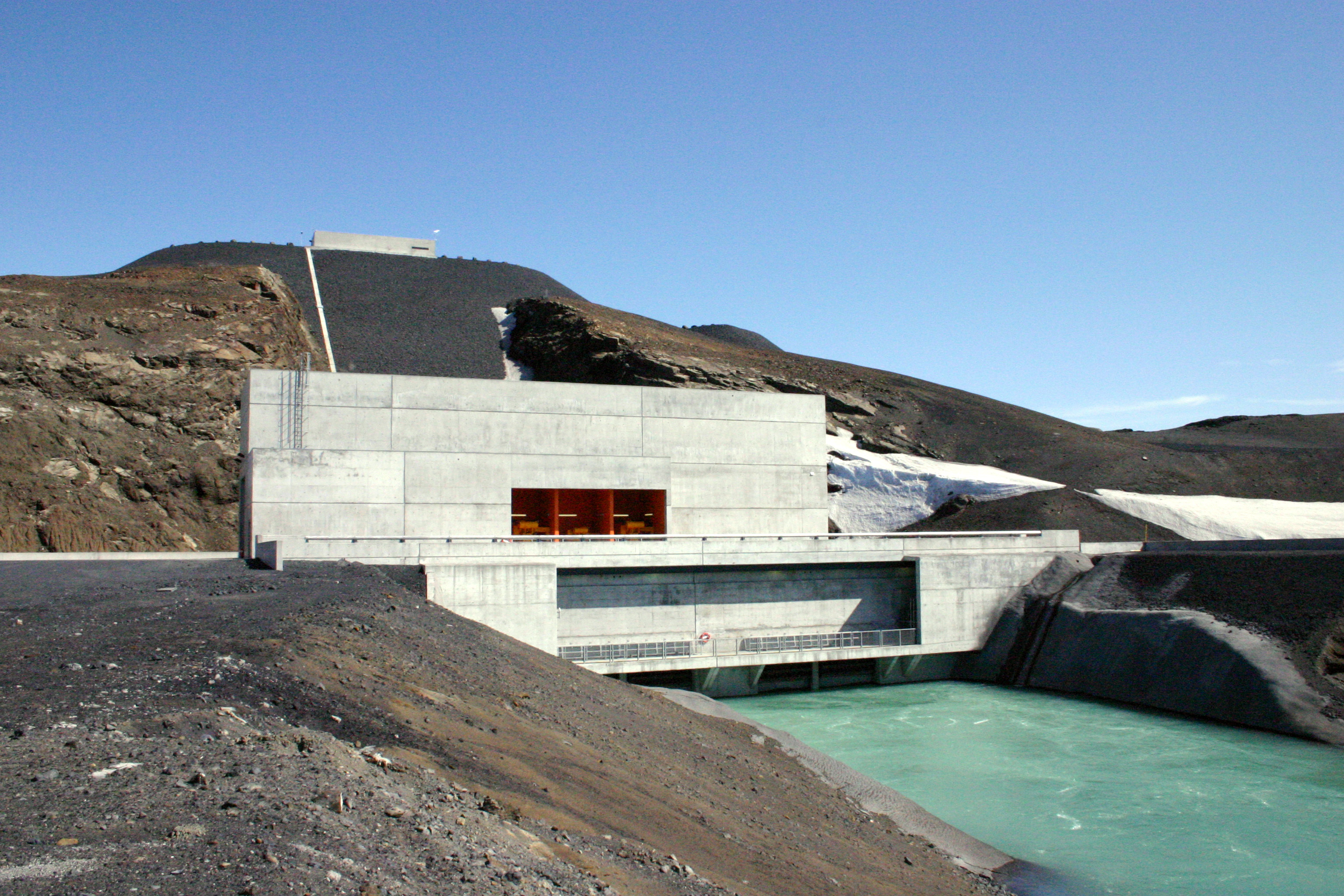
Vatnsfell hydropower station

The following lists events that happened in 2005 in Iceland.

== Incumbents ==
- President – Ólafur Ragnar Grímsson
- Prime Minister – Halldór Ásgrímsson

== Events ==
=== March ===
- March 15 - Japanese immigration officials state that they are going to deport Bobby Fischer back to the United States, instead of allowing him to move to Iceland.
- March 21 - Iceland's parliament, Alþingi, votes to grant fugitive U.S. chess champion Bobby Fischer Icelandic citizenship.
- March 24 - Bobby Fischer leaves Japan for Iceland via Copenhagen after 8 months in detention.

== Deaths ==
- March 26 - Einar Bragi, 83, poet and publisher.
- July 28 - Bergur Sigurbjörnsson, 88, magazine editor and politician.
- September 10 - Jónas Halldórsson, 91, Olympic water polo player (1936).
