= 1998 in Iceland =

- Decades: 1970s; 1980s; 1990s; 2000s; 2010s
- See also: Other events of 1998; Timeline of Icelandic history

The following lists events that happened in 1998 in Iceland.

== Incumbents ==
- President – Ólafur Ragnar Grímsson
- Prime Minister – Davíð Oddsson

== Events ==
- 7-22 February – Iceland send 7 athletes to the 1998 Winter Olympics in Japan, all to compete in alpine skiing, without winning any medals.
- 5 September – In a UEFA Euro 2000 qualifying match, the Iceland national football team draw 1-1 with France. Player Ríkharður Daðason scored for Iceland with a header.
- 14 October – In another UEFA qualifier, Iceland win 1-0 against Russia, after Yuri Kovtun achieved an own goal.
- 18-28 December – The volcano Grímsvötn erupts, causing a plume that can be seen 200 km away in Reykjavík.
- Karl Sigurbjörnsson became the thirteenth Bishop of Iceland, succeeding Ólafur Skúlason in the position.

== See also ==
- Iceland at the 1998 Winter Olympics
