= 2013 in Iceland =

- Decades: 1990s; 2000s; 2010s; 2020s
- See also: Other events of 2013; Timeline of Icelandic history

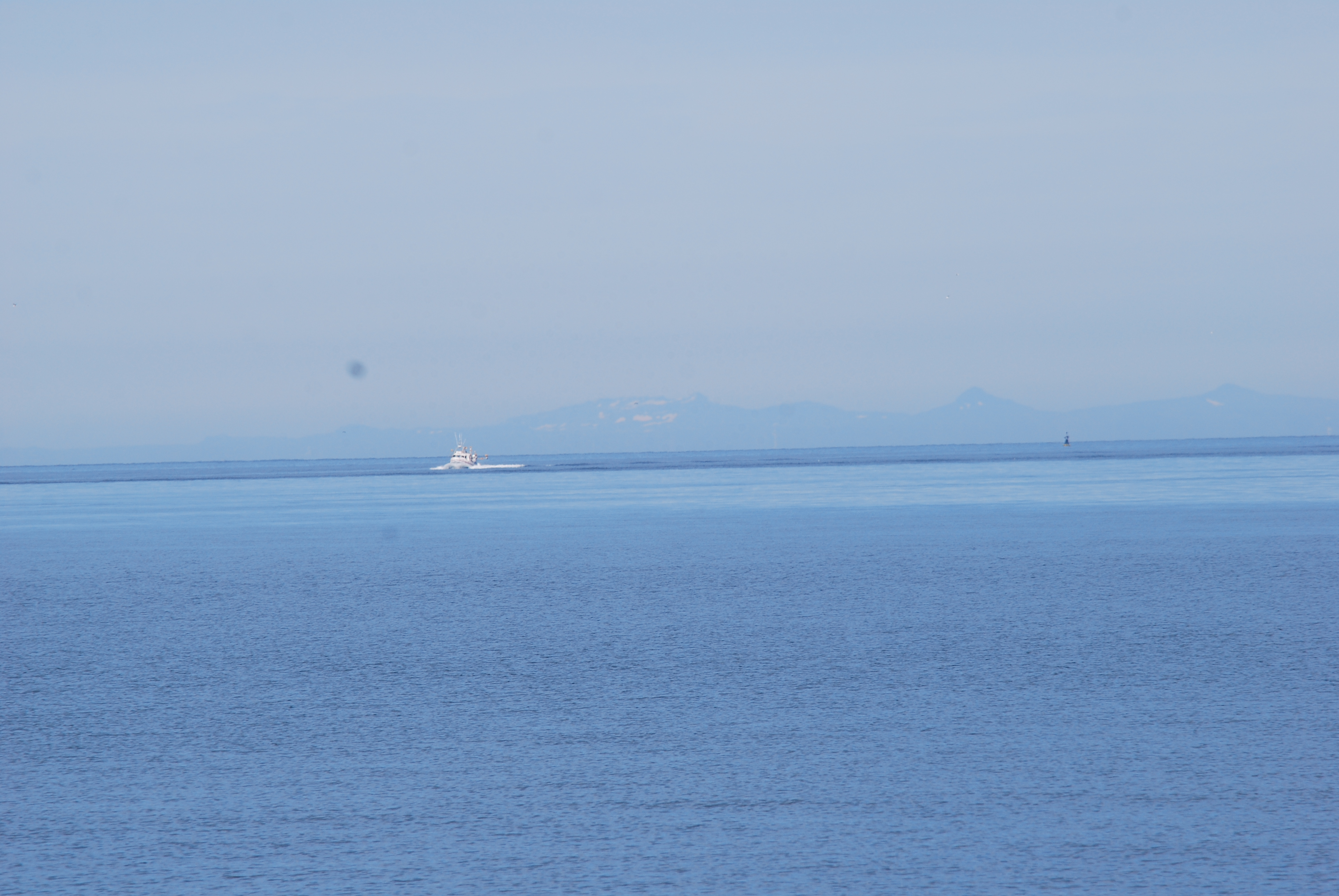
Gulf of Reykjavík 2013

The following lists events that happened in 2013 in Iceland.

== Incumbents ==
- President – Ólafur Ragnar Grímsson
- Prime Minister – Jóhanna Sigurðardóttir (until 23 May), Sigmundur Davíð Gunnlaugsson (starting 23 May)

== Events ==
=== January ===
- January 31 - Icelandic teenager Blaer Bjarkardottir wins a legal fight to use the name given to her by her mother, which the Icelandic Naming Committee had argued was not a proper female given name.

=== February ===
- February 27 - Gæðakokkar 30% meat pie on Iceland is found to not contain any meat at all.

=== April ===
- April 27 - Voters in Iceland go to the polls for a parliamentary election with a centre-right coalition expected to regain office.

=== May ===
- May 22 - Prime Minister elect of Iceland, Sigmundur Davíð Gunnlaugsson, declares that a January decision to freeze European Union membership talks will be extended indefinitely.

=== December ===
- December 2 - The Icelandic police kills a person for the first time since it became a republic in 1944.
- December 12 - Four former Icelandic bank bosses are jailed over concealing illegal activities within the bank Kaupthing.
