= 2010 in Iceland =

- Decades: 1990s; 2000s; 2010s; 2020s
- See also: Other events of 2010; Timeline of Icelandic history

The following lists events that happened in 2010 in Iceland.

== Incumbents ==
- President – Ólafur Ragnar Grímsson
- Prime Minister – Jóhanna Sigurðardóttir

== Events ==
=== January ===
- January 2 - A quarter of voters in Iceland sign a petition asking President Ólafur Ragnar Grímsson to veto a bill on repaying US$5 billion to foreign savers who lost their money when Icelandic banks collapsed.
- January 5 - President Ólafur Ragnar Grímsson announces a referendum during a live televised speech.

=== March ===
- March 6 - Iceland holds a referendum about compensating the United Kingdom and the Netherlands after the collapse of the Icesave bank, with a 95% "no" vote recorded.
- The Eyjafjallajökull volcano in Iceland shows increased seismic activity.
- March 20 - Eyjafjallajökull erupts, starting mass destruction in Europe.

=== April ===
- Scientists use the NOAA HYSPLIT model to track ash dispersion of Eyjafjallajökul.
- April 13 - An American Boeing 767 passenger jet makes an emergency landing in Iceland after reports of chemical fumes in the cabin. A spokesman for Keflavik airport outside Reykjavík says several crew members on the American Airlines flight had complained of dizziness.
- April 14 - Eyjafjallajökul eruption reaches central crater, melting ice & creating massive ash plumes. Air traffic is closed over Northern Norway as the ash cloud drifts towards Europe.
- April 14 - Scotland and Northern England airspace is closed due to the oncoming ash cloud.
- April 14 - 800 people, mostly farmers, are evacuated from Eyjafjallajökul.
- April 14 - The ash cloud reduces visibility to less than 1 kilometre in some places.
- April 15 - The ash cloud reaches Shetland, and the locals report a strong sulfuric smell.
- April 15 - All British airspace is closed down due to the cloud.
- April 16 - NASA’s Terra satellite captures images of ash drifting over northern Europe as it reaches 5km in height.
- April 17 - Ash plume rises over 8km.
- April 18 - Increased tremor levels are detected, and GPS data shows ground deformation.
- April 19 - Ice cauldrons enlarge, and minor glacial flooding begins.
- April 24 - The IES starts detailed daily status reports on the eruption as mild explosive activity continues.

=== May ===
- Airspace reopens gradually after the Eyjafjallajökul eruption, as researchers continue to help assess safety risks.
- May 4 - Lava flow reaches 500 m elevation from Eyjafjallajökul.
- May 18 - Volcanic activity remains stable as the magma eruption rate stabilizes at 200 tonnes/second.
- May 25 - Only steam is now observed from Eyjafjallajökul.

== Deaths ==
- 4 June – Pétur Sigurgeirsson, the eleventh Bishop of Iceland, served in office in 1981-1989 (b. 1919)
