= 1995 in Iceland =

- Decades: 1970s; 1980s; 1990s; 2000s; 2010s
- See also: Other events of 1995; Timeline of Icelandic history

The following lists events that happened in 1995 in Iceland.

== Incumbents ==
- President – Vigdís Finnbogadóttir
- Prime Minister – Davíð Oddsson
