= 1994 in Iceland =

- Decades: 1970s; 1980s; 1990s; 2000s; 2010s
- See also: Other events of 1994; Timeline of Icelandic history

The following lists events that happened in 1994 in Iceland.

== Incumbents ==
- President – Vigdís Finnbogadóttir
- Prime Minister – Davíð Oddsson

== Events ==
- Ásgeir Elíasson is the coach of the Icelandic Association Football team.
- Iceland's main export destination is the United Kingdom, with exports valued at US$331,000,000.
- Iceland's primary import source is the United Kingdom, with imports valued at $221,000,000.
- Intraplate earthquake recorded in Vestfirðir.
- Icelanders marked the 50th anniversary of their independence from Denmark.

== Births ==
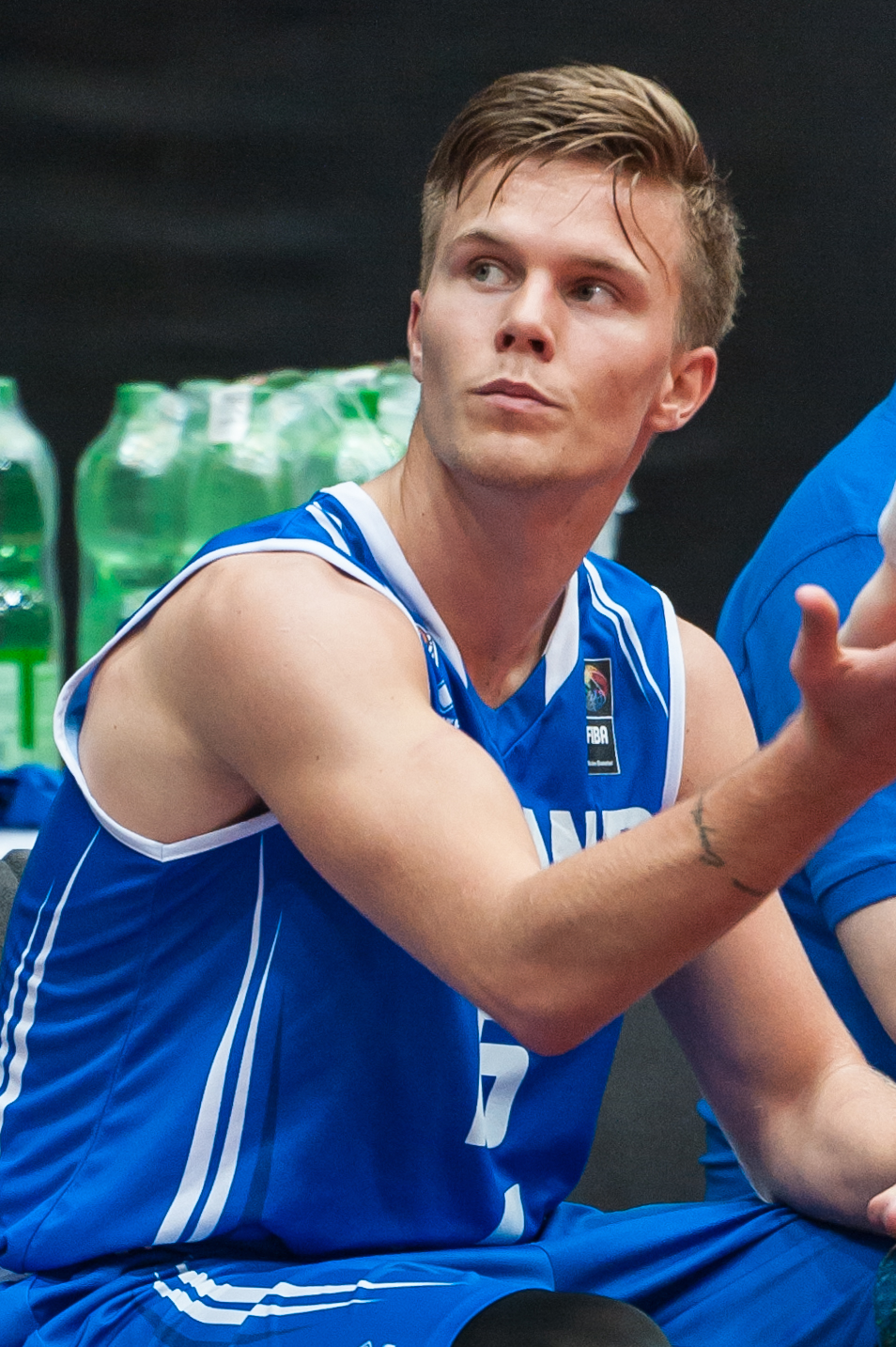
Martin Hermannsson

- 3 January – Einar Kristgeirsson, alpine skier.
- 3 January – Gudmunda Brynja Óladóttir, footballer
- 27 January – Erla Ásgeirsdóttir, alpine skier.
- 9 May – Árni Vilhjálmsson, footballer
- 16 September – Martin Hermannsson, basketball player
- 3 November – Tinna Odinsdottir, artistic gymnast
- 10 November – Aron Elís Þrándarson, footballer

=== Full date missing ===
- Freydis-Halla Einarsdóttir, alpine skier

== Deaths ==
- 7 April – Albert Guðmundsson, footballer (b. 1923)
- 18 November – Lúdvik Jósepsson, politician (b. 1914)
