= Hafstað =

Hafstað is a surname. Notable people with the surname include:

- Karin Hafstad (1936–2019), Norwegian politician
- Lawrence R. Hafstad (1904–1993), American electrical engineer
- Thomas Hafstad (born 1974), Norwegian footballer
- Tobias Hafstad (born 2002), Norwegian footballer
- Valgerður Hafstað (1930–2011), Icelandic painter
