= 2002 in Iceland =

- Decades: 1980s; 1990s; 2000s; 2010s; 2020s
- See also: Other events of 2002; Timeline of Icelandic history

The following lists events that happened in 2002 in Iceland.

== Incumbents ==
- President – Ólafur Ragnar Grímsson
- Prime Minister – Davíð Oddsson

== Events ==
- Establishment of the Reykjavík Mosque.
