= 2016 in Iceland =

- Decades: 1990s; 2000s; 2010s; 2020s
- See also: Other events of 2016; Timeline of Icelandic history

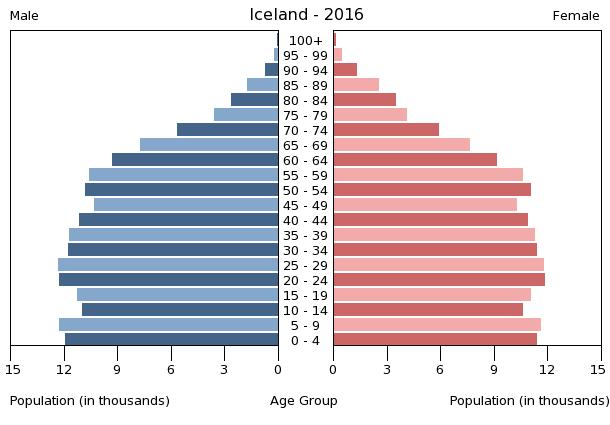

The following lists events in the year 2016 in Iceland.

== Incumbents ==
- President - Ólafur Ragnar Grímsson (until 1 August), Guðni Th. Jóhannesson (from 1 August)
- Prime Minister - Sigmundur Davíð Gunnlaugsson (until 7 April), Sigurður Ingi Jóhannsson (from 7 April)

== Events ==
=== April ===
- 4 April - Anti-government protests begin in Reykjavík in response to allegations that Prime Minister Gunnlaugsson was attempting to hide millions of dollars in investments according to tax documents in the Panama Papers.
- 5 April - Prime Minister Gunnlaugsson resigns over allegations of his family's involvement in the Panama Papers.

== Deaths ==
- 29 January – Ragnhildur Helgadóttir, politician (born 1930).
- 14 July – Kristín Halldórsdóttir, politician (born 1939).

== See also ==
- Iceland at the 2016 Summer Olympics
