= 2015 in Iceland =

- Decades: 1990s; 2000s; 2010s; 2020s
- See also: Other events of 2015; Timeline of Icelandic history

The following lists events and other items of interest occurring in 2015 in Iceland.

== Incumbents ==
- President – Ólafur Ragnar Grímsson
- Prime Minister – Sigmundur Davíð Gunnlaugsson

== Deaths ==
- 22 April – Páll Skúlason, 69, philosopher
- 18 May – Halldór Ásgrímsson, 67, Prime Minister of Iceland (2004–2006) (heart attack)
- 2 August – Guðmunda Elíasdóttir, 95, film actress and opera singer
