= 1993 in Iceland =

- Decades: 1970s; 1980s; 1990s; 2000s; 2010s
- See also: Other events of 1993; Timeline of Icelandic history

The following lists events that happened in 1993 in Iceland.

== Incumbents ==
- President – Vigdís Finnbogadóttir
- Prime Minister – Davíð Oddsson

== Events ==
- The now defunct software company FRISK Software International was founded in Reykjavík.

== Births ==
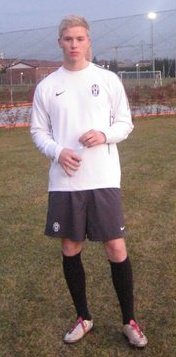
Hörður Björgvin Magnússon

- 2 February – María Ólafsdóttir, singer and actress
- 11 February – Hörður Björgvin Magnússon, footballer
- 7 March – Sigtryggur Arnar Björnsson, basketball player
- 9 March – Stony, actor, hip-hop artist, singer, drummer and producer
- 19 April – Hólmbert Friðjónsson, footballer
- 26 April – Kristján Emilsson, footballer
- 30 April – Arnór Ingvi Traustason, footballer.
- 10 May – Katrín Davíðsdóttir, CrossFit athlete
- 22 July – Emil Atlason, footballer
- 8 October – Aron Sigurðarson, footballer
- 18 December – Anton Sveinn McKee, swimmer.

=== Full date missing ===
- Birna Berg Haraldsdóttir, handball player
- María Guðmundsdóttir, alpine skier

== Deaths ==
- 16 January – Jón Páll Sigmarsson, strongman, powerlifter and bodybuilder (b. 1960).
- 23 December – Sveinbjörn Beinteinsson, religious leader (b. 1924)
