= 2000 in Iceland =

- Decades: 1980s; 1990s; 2000s; 2010s; 2020s
- See also: Other events of 2000; Timeline of Icelandic history

The following lists events that happened in 2000 in Iceland.

== Incumbents ==
- President – Ólafur Ragnar Grímsson
- Prime Minister – Davíð Oddsson

== Events ==
=== May ===
- May 25 – 53rd Cannes Film Festival: Icelandic singer Björk wins the Best Actress Award for her performance in "Dancer in the Dark".

=== June ===
- June 17 and 21 – 2000 Iceland earthquakes hit in southern Iceland: a few people were injured and some considerable damage to infrastructure.
