= 1997 in Iceland =

- Decades: 1970s; 1980s; 1990s; 2000s; 2010s
- See also: Other events of 1997; Timeline of Icelandic history

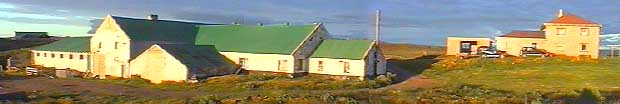
The Icelandic farm Arnarholt í Stafholtstungum, 1997

The following lists events that happened in 1997 in Iceland.

== Incumbents ==
- President – Ólafur Ragnar Grímsson
- Prime Minister – Davíð Oddsson

== Events ==
- June 2 - June 7: The VI games of the 1997 Games of the Small States of Europe where held in Reykjavik, Iceland with 8 nations participating.
