= 1999 in Iceland =

- Decades: 1970s; 1980s; 1990s; 2000s; 2010s
- See also: Other events of 1999; Timeline of Icelandic history

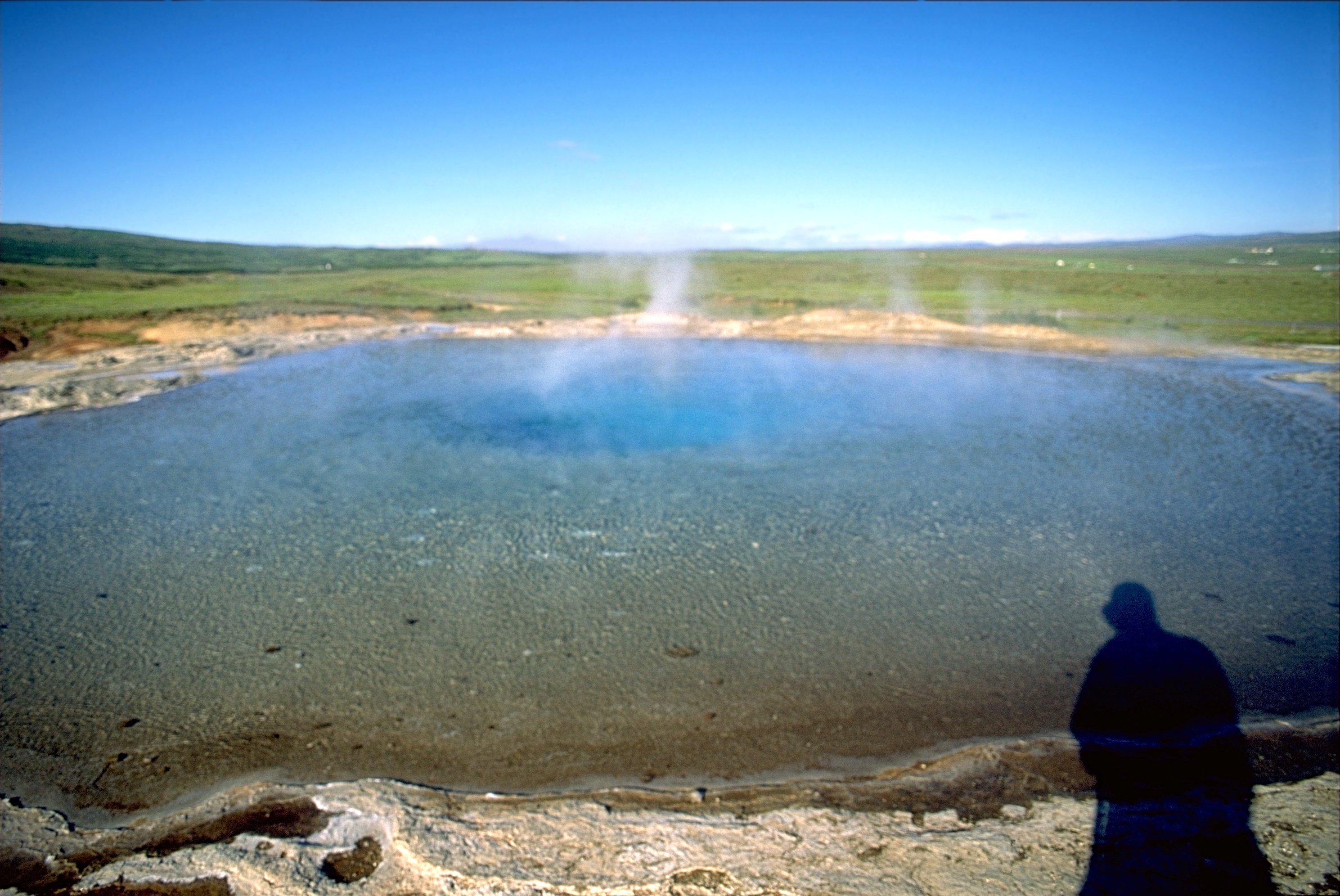
Great Geysir pool.jpn

The following lists events that happened in 1999 in Iceland.

== Incumbents ==
- President – Ólafur Ragnar Grímsson
- Prime Minister – Davíð Oddsson

== Events ==
- 1 May - founding of the Aviation Museum of Iceland
- 8 May - 1999 Icelandic parliamentary election
