= 2004 in Iceland =

- Decades: 1980s; 1990s; 2000s; 2010s; 2020s
- See also: Other events of 2004; Timeline of Icelandic history

The following events happened in Iceland in the year 2004.

== Incumbents ==
- President – Ólafur Ragnar Grímsson
- Prime Minister – Davíð Oddsson (until 29 September), Halldór Ásgrímsson (starting 29 September)

== Events ==
=== June ===
- June 26 - A presidential election was held with Ólafur Ragnar Grímsson winning making him President of Iceland.

=== August ===
- August 16 - LazyTown (Icelandic Latibær) was first aired on RÚV in Iceland and was broadcast in over 180 countries

=== September ===
- September 15 - The cabinet of Halldór Ásgrímsson is formed.
