= 2003 in Iceland =

- Decades: 1980s; 1990s; 2000s; 2010s; 2020s
- See also: Other events of 2003; Timeline of Icelandic history

The following lists events that happened in 2003 in Iceland.

== Incumbents ==
- President – Ólafur Ragnar Grímsson
- Prime Minister – Davíð Oddsson

== Events ==
=== May ===
- May 10 - A parliamentary election was held in Iceland.
- May 23 - The fourth cabinet of Davíð Oddsson was formed.
