= Gunnar Karlsson =

Icelandic historian (1939–2019)

Gunnar Karlsson (26 September 1939 – 28 October 2019) was an Icelandic historian. Gunnar shaped methodological teaching at the University of Iceland in Reykjavík when he started working there in the seventies and wrote a number of textbooks in history for all school levels as well as other publications.

== Life and works ==
Gunnar was born on 26 September, 1939, in Laugardalur, Reykjavík. He studied history at the University of Iceland. He completed his studies in 1970 and received his doctorate there in 1978. From 1974 to 1976 he taught at the University College London, and after 1976 at University of Iceland, where he was appointed professor in 1980.

Gunnar contributed mainly to medieval Icelandic history, but also presented comprehensive accounts of Icelandic history in English.

He died on 28 October, 2019, in Reykjavík.

== Personal life ==
Gunnar married Silja Aðalsteinsdóttir, and they had 3 children.

== Works (selection) ==
- (as editor): Grágás. Lagasafn íslenska þjóðveldisins. Reykjavík: Mál og menning, 1992, ISBN 9979-3-0403-0.
- Iceland's 1100 years: The History of a Marginal Society. London: Hurst, 2000, ISBN 1-85065-414-X. Reprinted in North America as: The History of Iceland. Minneapolis: University of Minnesota Press, 2000.
- Handbók í íslenskri miðaldasögu. 3 vols. Reykjavík: Háskólaútgáfan, 2007–2016, ISBN 978-9979-54-767-9 (vol. 1), ISBN 978-9935-23-113-0 (vol. 2), ISBN 978-9979-54-846-1 (vol. 3).
- A Brief History of Iceland, Reykjavík 2010, ISBN 978-9979-3-3155-1.
- The Settlement of Iceland. A Story from the Ninth and Tenth Centuries. Reykjavík: Mál og menning, 2019, ISBN 978-9979-3-4082-9.
