= 2006 in Iceland =

- Decades: 1980s; 1990s; 2000s; 2010s; 2020s
- See also: Other events of 2006; Timeline of Icelandic history

The following lists events that happened in 2006 in Iceland.

== Incumbents ==
- President – Ólafur Ragnar Grímsson
- Prime Minister – Halldór Ásgrímsson (until 15 June), Geir Haarde (starting 15 June)

== Events ==
=== June ===
- June 6 - Iceland's Prime Minister Halldór Ásgrímsson resigns after poor showings in local elections. Foreign Minister Geir Haarde takes over.

=== October ===
- October 17 - Whaling in Iceland is to resume, in contravention of a 20-year moratorium passed by the International Whaling Commission.
- October 22 - Icelandic fisherman kill a fin whale, breaking the International Whaling Commission's ban on commercial whaling.
