= 1991 in Iceland =

- Decades: 1970s; 1980s; 1990s; 2000s; 2010s
- See also: Other events of 1991; Timeline of Icelandic history

The following lists events that happened in 1991 in Iceland.

== Incumbents ==
- President – Vigdís Finnbogadóttir
- Prime Minister – Steingrímur Hermannsson, Davíð Oddsson

== Events ==
- 20 April – Icelandic parliamentary election, 1991

== Births ==
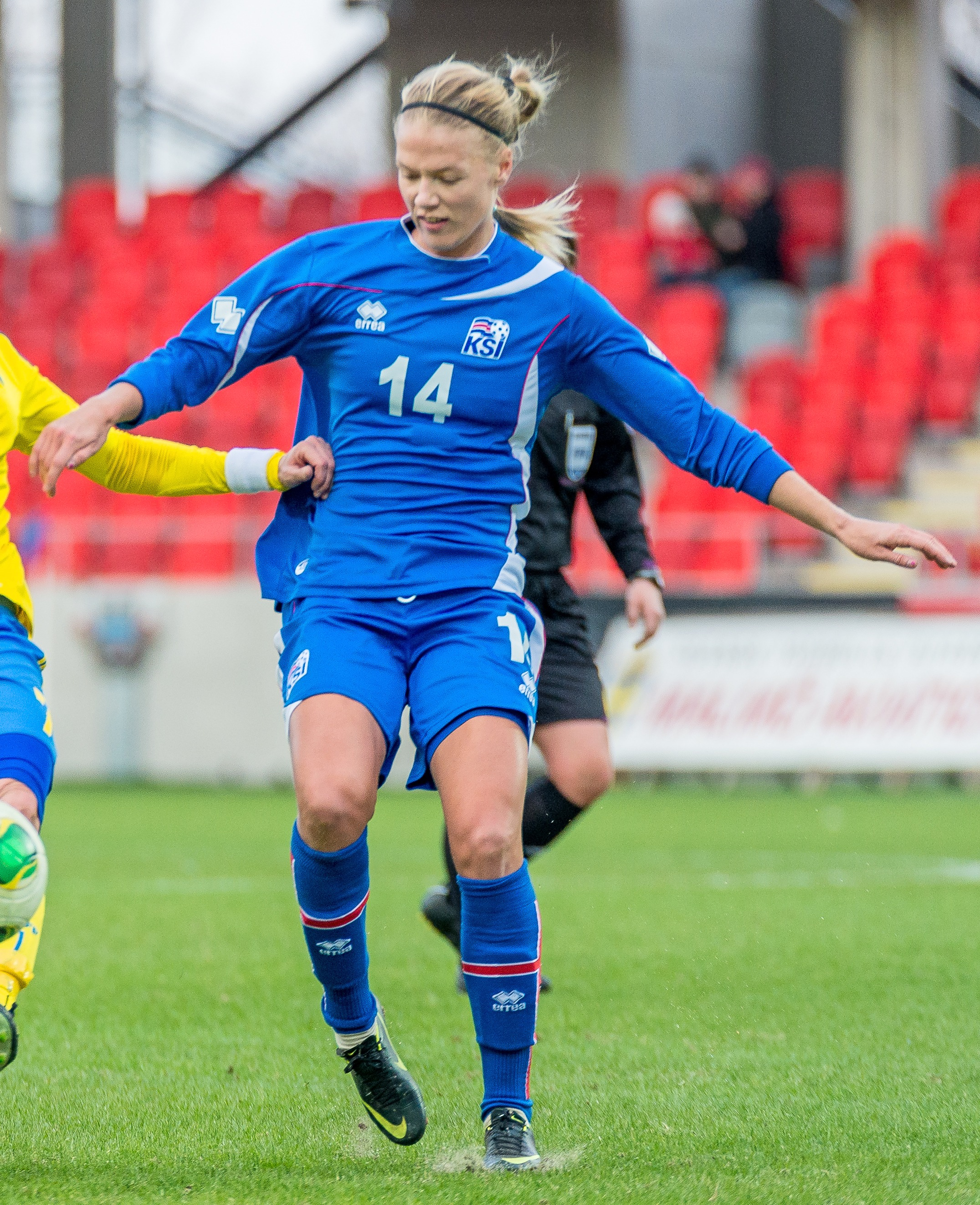
Dagný Brynjarsdóttir

- 26 February – Björn Bergmann Sigurðarson, footballer.
- 16 March – Arnar Darri Pétursson, footballer
- 8 April – Dröfn Haraldsdóttir, handball player
- 10 May – Ægir Steinarsson, basketball player
- 28 June – Jóhanna María Sigmundsdóttir, politician.
- 2 August – Hrafnhildur Lúthersdóttir, swimmer.
- 10 August – Dagný Brynjarsdóttir, footballer
- 1 September – Haukur Heiðar Hauksson, footballer
- 15 November – Helga Margrét Þorsteinsdóttir, heptathlete

== Deaths ==
- 1 September – Hannibal Valdimarsson, politician (b. 1903).
- 4 April – Pálmi Jónsson, businessman and entrepreneur (b. 1923)
