= Staðamál =

The staðamál ('church-estate conflict') was a conflict between the bishops and secular aristocrats of Iceland over the control of proprietary churches which the arisocrats had established on their own estates and viewed as their own property (thus receiving part of the tithes pertaining to them).

The staðamál proceeded in two waves. First, the year after Þorlákur helgi Þórhallsson became bishop of Skálholt in 1178, he began to demand control over ecclesiastical estates, following the reforms of Archbishop Eysteinn Erlendsson of Niðarós. This staðamál concluded with Þorlákur seizing control over a number of ecclesiastical estates, but otherwise little changed except that it became clear to aristocrats that the Church did not view their control of proprietary churches as legal.

The later staðamál began when Bishop Árni Þorláksson of Skálholt (who earned himself the nickname "Staða-Árni") undertook a further reorganisation of the local church, known as Kristnirétt Árna, in 1275. This concluded with a special settlement between Árni and Iceland's secular aristocrats in Ögvaldsnes in Norway in 1297, under the leadership of Jörundur Þorsteinsson and King Eiríkur Magnússon. It was decided that those establishments where the disputants owned half of the revenues or more should remain in the control of their former owners, but that the remainder should pass to the bishop. In this way, the Church gained independence from secular powers with regard to churches, priests, church law and customs. Subsequently, the power of the Church grew at the expense of secular aristocrats, and over time ever more church estates came under episcopal control.
