= Thelir =

North Germanic tribe

The Thelir or Thilir (Old Norse: Þilir; Norwegian Bokmål: teler; Norwegian Nynorsk: telar or teler) was a North Germanic tribe that inhabited the region now known as Upper Telemark in modern Norway during the Migration Period and the Viking Age. The region of Telemark, which originally only referred to Upper Telemark, was named after them, and means the "mark of the Thelir." The Thelir are mentioned in the Saga of Harald Fairhair by Snorri Sturluson, as one of the tribes who fought against Harald Fairhair in the Battle of Hafrsfjord.
