= Sunneva Einarsdóttir =

Icelandic handball player (born 1990)

Personal information
- Nationality: Icelandic
- Born: January 3, 1990 (age 36) Reykjavik, Iceland
- Height: 174 cm (69 in)

Sport
- Sport: Handball
- Position: Goalkeeper

Senior clubs
- Years: Team
- –: Fram
- –: Valur
- –: Fram
National team
Years	Team	Apps	(Gls)
–	Iceland	11	(0)

Sunneva Einarsdóttir (born January 3, 1990) is an Icelandic team handball goalkeeper. She plays on the Icelandic national team, and participated at the 2011 World Women's Handball Championship in Brazil.
