= Proprietary church =

Church built on private ground by a feudal lord

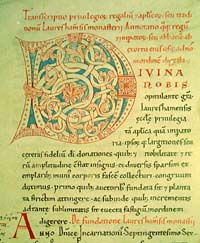
Opening page of the Lorsch Codex, detailing the Lorsch land holdings of the proprietary Lorsch Abbey

During the Middle Ages, a proprietary church (Latin ecclesia propria, German Eigenkirche) was a church, abbey or cloister built on private ground by a feudal lord, over which he retained proprietary interests, especially the right of what in English law is "advowson", that of nominating the ecclesiastic personnel.

== History ==
In the later Roman Empire the church had been centrally organized: all monasteries and churches within a diocese, including their personnel and their properties, were under the jurisdiction of the local bishop. As early as the late 5th century, Pope Gelasius I listed conditions under which bishops could consecrate new churches within the metropolitan see of Rome. One of the conditions was that the new establishment be endowed with sufficient means to provide for vestments, lights, and the support of the priest serving there. Sometimes the church was part of a large estate; others were themselves vast landed estates.

=== Early Middle Ages ===
The development of proprietary churches was a product of feudalism. The founding lord or seigneur might be a layman, bishop, or abbot, but only the diocesan bishop had the authority to consecrate the church or ordain the priest to serve there. The Council of Trosly (909) defined such churches as the dominium of the seigneur, but the gubernatio of the bishop. It was the responsibility of the bishop to ensure that the building was kept in good repair and appropriately lighted, and to determine the parochial boundaries.

Within the Carolingian Empire, the rules concerning proprietary churches had been expressly formulated in the ninth century, at the reforming councils of 808, under Charlemagne and of 818/9, under Louis the Pious. Then proprietary churches had been officially recognized, but the capitulations identify some of the associated excesses, for it was agreed that the proprietor should not appoint nor depose priests without the assent of the bishop, nor appoint unfree persons. Every church was to be provided with a manse and its garden that were free of seigneurial dues, where the priest could support himself, providing spiritual services. The rights of proprietarial founders were also delimited and protected, for the bishop could not refuse to ordain a suitable candidate; the legislation also protected the founder's right over proprietary abbeys to appoint a member of the founding family.

A practice developed in 8th-century Germany of donating a proprietary church to a larger church or cathedral with certain conditions, such as reserving the usufruct to a member of the family, sometimes for more than one generation. Sometimes the donation was revocable upon the possible return of a distant heir. Other conditions might preclude it as ever being awarded as a benefice, on penalty of reverting to the family. The usufruct might be reserved to a female (ancilla dei) or a male as yet unborn, let alone not yet in Holy Orders, and allowed the donor to make provision for the support of family members. A donation couched in such terms to a third party, served to provide some protection against subsequent challenges by other family members.

Ulrich Stutz argued that the institution of the proprietary church existed particularly in areas that had never been Roman, among the Irish and the Slavs, and in the Eastern Roman Empire, but the proprietary church is best known in Germany, where the Grundherr, the landlord who had founded the church on his property and endowed it from his lands, maintained the right of investiture, as he was the advocatus (German Vogt) of the fief, and responsible for its security and good order. In the 9th and 10th centuries the establishment of proprietary churches in Germany swelled to their maximum. The layman who held the position was a lay abbot. The altar was the legal anchor to which the structures, the land, the rights and ties were attached. The proprietor and his heirs retained unabated legal rights to the ground on behalf of the saint whose relics lay beneath the altar. "He could sell, lend or lease the altar, leave it to his heirs, use it for dower, or mortgage it, provided that a church, once dedicated, continued to be used as a church." However, the founder could not alienate any of the land or appurtenances designated for the maintenance of the church and support of the priest. Dedicating land for a religious use was one way to preserve it from being partitioned into parcels too small for effective economic use.

According to George W.O. Addleshaw, French historians attribute the development of proprietary churches to the decentralization that ensued with the collapse of the Roman Empire in the West and the increased authority of late Roman and Merovingian landowners, who assumed responsibility for rural churches in lieu of bishops in their urban sees.

=== Later Middle Ages ===
The proprietary right could be granted away or otherwise alienated, even for a sum of money, which compromised the position of the spiritual community that it served. In a small parish church this right may be trivial, but in the German territories of Otto the Great it was an essential check and control on the church, through which the Holy Roman Emperor largely ruled.

Simony, the outright purchase of an ecclesiastic position through payment or barter, was an ever-present problem, one that was attacked over and over in all the synods of the 11th- and early 12th-century Gregorian reforms, and fuelled the Investiture Controversy. The benefice system grew out of the proprietary churches.

The royal peculiars have remained proprietary churches until today.

A Medieval example is the church of Littleham, Devon, mentioned in 1422.

== Lorsch Abbey ==
An example of a proprietary church is Lorsch Abbey, founded in 764 by the Frankish Count Cancor and his widowed mother Williswinda as a church and monastery on their estate, Laurissa. They entrusted its administration to Cancor's nephew Chrodegang, Archbishop of Metz, who became its first abbot. In 766 Chrodegang resigned the office of abbot, in favour of his brother Gundeland.

== See also ==
- Proprietary chapel
- Staðamál
