= Valgerður Hafstað =

Icelandic painter (1930–2011)

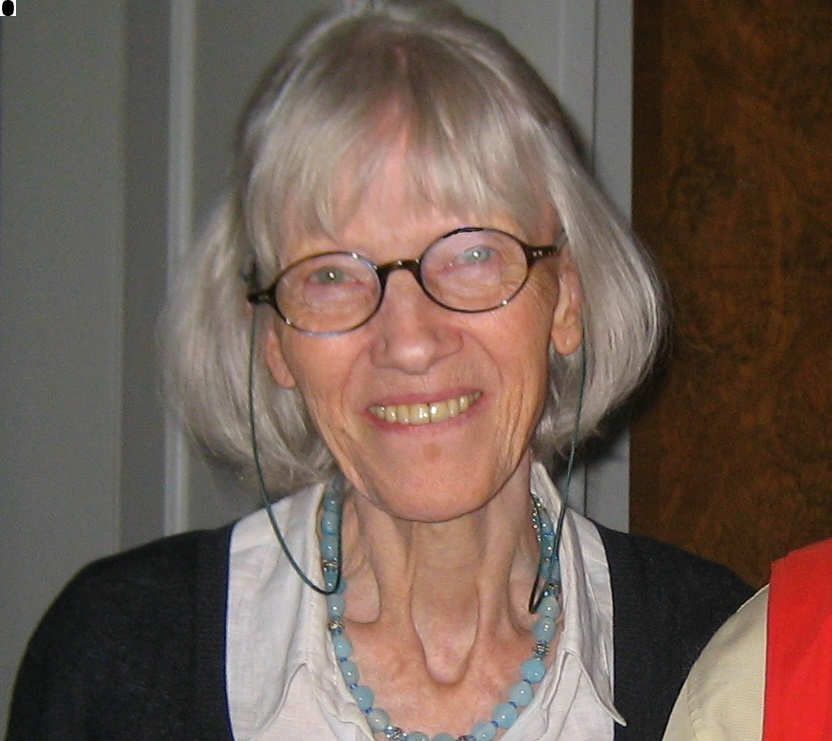
- Born: 1 June 1930; Vík, South Constituency, Iceland
- Died: 9 March 2011 (aged 80); Reykjavík, Iceland
- Citizenship: Iceland
- Education: Académie de la Grande Chaumière
- Occupation: Painter
- Spouse: André Énard (m. 1958; died 2010)
- Children: 3

Valgerður Hafstað (1 June 1930 – 9 March 2011) was an Icelandic painter who worked with acrylic, oil and watercolours. She was educated at the Academy of Free and Mercantile Art in Copenhagen, the School of Arts and Crafts in Reykjavík and Paris' Académie de la Grande Chaumière. Valgerður worked on mineral windows and mosaics and produced several privately owned paintings.

== Biography ==
On 1 June 1930, Valgerður was born in Vík in the South Constituency. She was the daughter of Árni Hafstað and Ingibjörg Sigurðardóttir. Valgerður had ten siblings and she was the youngest of them all. She was educated in art at the Academy of Free and Mercantile Art in Copenhagen before matriculated to the School of Arts and Crafts in Reykjavík. Valgerður remained in Reykjavík until 1948, when she went to Paris to study at the Académie de la Grande Chaumière. She studied mosaic and painting at the Academy, remaining there until 1952.

Valgerður went on to study mosaic processing at the Ecole des Arts Italiennes, and worked on mineral windows and mosaics. Her first art exhibition was a joint venture with Gerður Helgadóttir at Paris' Galerie La Rouge in 1957. Valgerður moved into a home near the French capital of Paris the following year and relocated to New York City in 1974. From 1981, she worked at the Reykjavík Art Museum Kjarvalsstaðir. Valgerður partook in the American-based Scandinavian Today between 1982 and 1984 and then with the travelling Borealis exhibition for which she received a salary from 1983 to 1984. Early in 1983, Valgerður took part in an exhibition held at the Reykjavík Art Museum Kjarvalsstaði.

Her works in Iceland include stained glass windows she did in Tjarnarkirkja in Svarfaðardalur and decorated a wall in Varmahlíðarskóli in Skagafjörður. Valgerður also produced several privately owned paintings. A posthumous exhibition of her works took place at Berg Culture House in July 2012. Three years later, the Kópavogur Art Museum held an exhibition of Valgerður's paintings.

== Personal life ==
She was married to the artist André Énard from August 1958 until his death in late 2010. There were three children of the marriage. On 9 March 2011, Valgerður died at Borgarspítalinn in Reykjavík. She was given a burial at Fossvogskirkja six days later.

== Artistry ==
She worked with acrylic, oils, and watercolour. RÚV described Valgerður's style as "on the borderline of the objective and the abstract, as it is often possible to discern vague landscape motifs or interior objects that she seems to have transformed in one way or another." It was observed that her brushstrokes "pile up in clusters, like loaded turf, or divide into rectangular units all over the light-saturated image surface." This enabled Valgerður to connected the gap between heavy planning and being free.

The DV newspaper wrote her works were traced to informal French paintings but without any intentional brush writing "because the language her work seems above all close neatly structured and in advance thought." Morgunblaðið noted her paintings appeared to be quite similar to those in European and that she continued to employ her previous technique instead of being influenced by art in the country she resided in for some of her adult life, the United States.
