= History of Iceland =

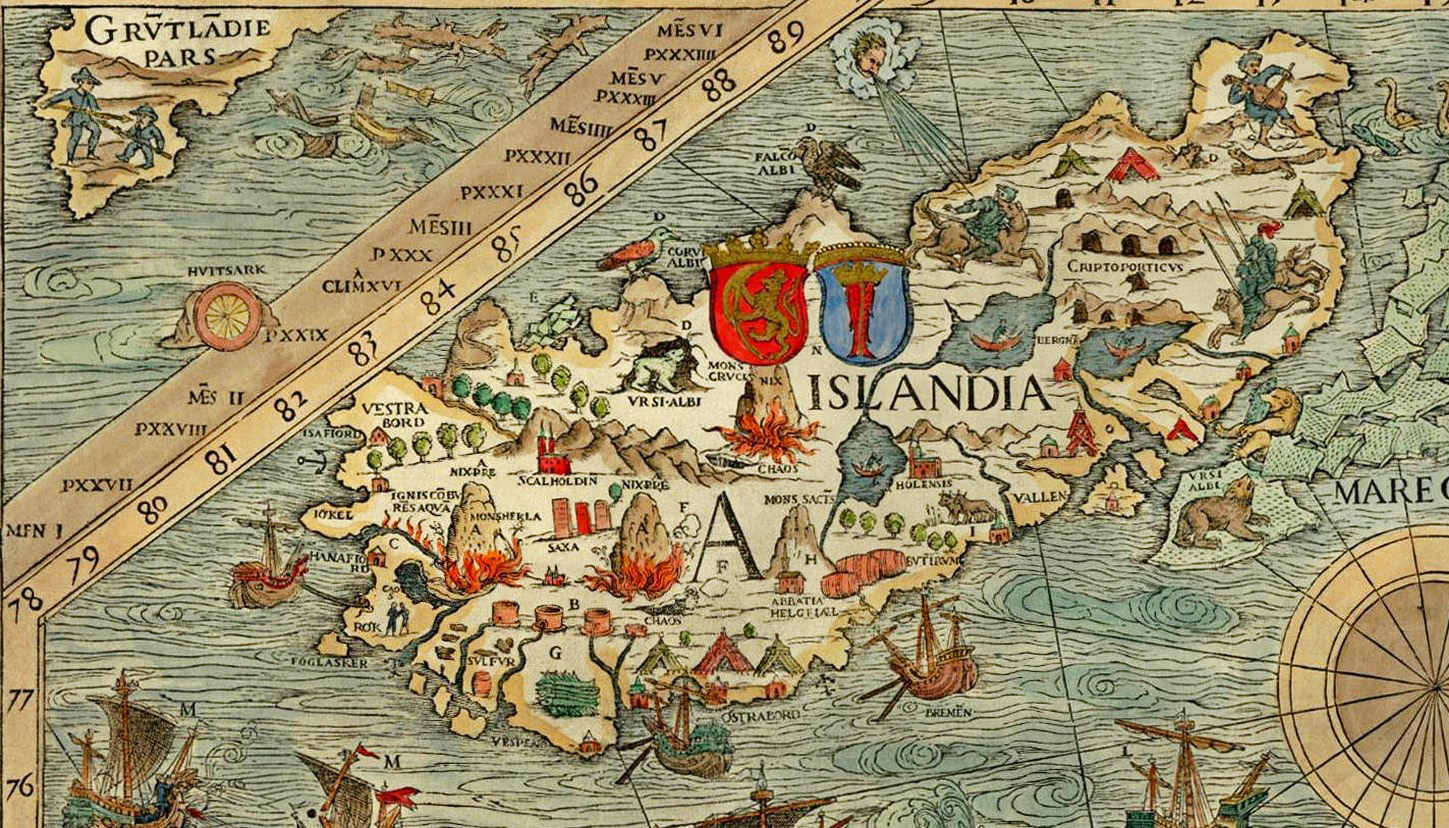
Iceland on the carta marina by Olaus Magnus.

The recorded history of Iceland began with the settlement by Viking explorers, mostly Norwegian, and the people they enslaved from Western Europe, particularly the British Isles, in the late ninth century. Iceland was still uninhabited long after the rest of Western Europe had been settled. Recorded settlement has conventionally been dated back to 874, although place names and storytelling indicate Gaelic monks from Ireland, known as papar from sagas, may have settled Iceland earlier.

The land was settled quickly, mainly by Norwegians who may have been fleeing conflict (the unification of Norway) or seeking new land to farm. By 930, the chieftains had established a form of governance, the Althing, making it one of the world's oldest parliaments. Towards the end of the tenth century, Christianity came to Iceland through the influence of the Norwegian king Olaf Tryggvason. During this time, Iceland remained independent, a period known as the Old Commonwealth, and Icelandic historians began to document the nation's history in books referred to as sagas of Icelanders. In the early thirteenth century, the internal conflict known as the age of the Sturlungs weakened Iceland, which eventually became subjugated to Norway over the 13th century. The Old Covenant (1262–1264), and the adoption of Jónsbók (1281) effectively ended the Icelandic Commonwealth. Norway, in turn, was united with Sweden (1319) and then Denmark (1376). Eventually all of the Nordic states were united in one alliance, the Kalmar Union (1397–1523), but on its dissolution, Iceland fell under Danish rule. The subsequent strict Danish–Icelandic Trade Monopoly in the seventeenth and eighteenth centuries was detrimental to the economy. Iceland's resultant poverty was aggravated by severe natural disasters like the Móðuharðindin or "Mist Hardships". During this time, the population declined.

Iceland remained part of Denmark, but in keeping with the rise of nationalism around Europe in the nineteenth century, an independence movement emerged. The Althing, which had been suspended in 1799, was restored in 1844, and Iceland gained sovereignty after World War I, becoming the Kingdom of Iceland on 1 December 1918. However, Iceland shared the Danish Monarchy until World War II. Iceland remained officially neutral during the war, but after Denmark was overrun by the German Wehrmacht, the United Kingdom invaded and peacefully occupied the island in May 1940 to forestall a Nazi occupation. Due to the island's strategic position in the North Atlantic, the Allies occupied the island until the end of the war, with the United States taking over occupation duties from the British in 1941. In 1944, Iceland severed its remaining ties with Denmark (then still under Nazi occupation) and declared itself a republic. Following the Second World War, Iceland was a founding member of the North Atlantic Treaty Organization and joined the United Nations one year after its establishment. Its economy grew rapidly, largely through fishing, although this was marred by disputes with other nations.

After the 1980 Icelandic presidential election, Vigdis Finnbogadottir assumed Iceland's presidency on August 1, 1980, the first elected female head of state in the world.

Following rapid financial growth, the 2008–2011 Icelandic financial crisis occurred. Iceland continues to remain outside the European Union.

Iceland is very remote, and so has been spared the ravages of European wars but has been affected by other external events, such as the Black Death and the Protestant Reformation imposed by Denmark. Iceland's history has also been marked by a number of natural disasters.

Iceland is a relatively young island in the geological sense, being formed about 20 million years ago by a series of volcanic eruptions in the Mid-Atlantic Ridge. It is still growing from fresh volcanic eruptions. The oldest stone specimens found in Iceland date back to c. 16 million years ago.

== Geological background ==
Mid-Atlantic Ridge and adjacent plates. Volcanoes indicated in red.

In geological terms, Iceland is a young island. It started to form in the Miocene era about 20 million years ago from a series of volcanic eruptions on the Mid-Atlantic Ridge, where it lies between the North American Plate and Eurasian Plate. These plates spread at a rate of approximately 2.5 centimeters per year. This elevated portion of the ridge is known as the Reykjanes Ridge. The volcanic activity is attributed to a hotspot, the Iceland hotspot, which in turn lies over a mantle plume (the Iceland Plume), a column of anomalously hot rock in the Earth's mantle which is likely to be partly responsible for the island's creation and continued existence. For comparison, it is estimated that other volcanic islands, such as the Faroe Islands have existed for about 55 million years, the Azores (on the same ridge) about 8 million years, and Hawaii less than a million years. The younger rock strata in the southwest of Iceland and the central highlands are only about 700,000 years old. The geological history of the Earth is divided into ice ages, based on temperature and climate. The last glacial period, commonly referred to as "the Ice Age", is thought to have begun about 110,000 years ago and ended about 10,000 years ago. While covered in ice, Iceland's icefalls, fjords and valleys were formed.

== Early history ==
Iceland remained, for a long time, one of the world's last uninhabited larger islands (alongside New Zealand and Madagascar). It has been suggested that the land called Thule by the Greek geographer Pytheas (fourth century BCE) was actually Iceland, although it seems highly unlikely considering Pytheas' description of it as an agricultural country with plenty of milk, honey, and fruit; the name is more likely to have referred to Norway, or possibly the Faroe Islands or Shetland. Many of the early settlers were Thelir, fleeing the recent union of Norway under Harald Fairhair and came from Telemark. A similar argument explains the name of Greenland from Grenland, neighbouring Telemark and also populated by Thelir. The exact date that humans first reached the island is uncertain. Roman coins dating to the third century have been found in Iceland, but it is unknown whether they were brought there at that time or came later with Vikings after circulating for centuries.

=== Irish monks ===
There is some literary evidence that monks from a Hiberno-Scottish mission may have settled in Iceland before the arrival of the Norsemen. The Landnámabók ("Book of Settlements"), written in the 1100s, mentions the presence of Irish monks, called the Papar, prior to Norse settlement and states that the monks left behind Irish books, bells, and crosiers, among other things. According to the same account, the Irish monks abandoned the country when the Norse arrived or had left prior to their arrival. The twelfth-century scholar Ari Þorgilsson's Íslendingabók reasserts that items including bells corresponding to those used by Irish monks were found by the settlers. No such artifacts have been discovered by archaeologists, however. Some Icelanders claimed descent from Cerball mac Dúnlainge, King of Osraige in southeastern Ireland, at the time of the Landnámabók's creation.

An archaeological excavation has revealed the ruins of a cabin in Hafnir on the Reykjanes peninsula (close to Keflavík International Airport). Carbon dating reveals that the cabin was abandoned sometime between 770 and 880, suggesting that Iceland was populated well before 874. This archaeological find may also indicate that the monks left Iceland before the Norse arrived.

=== Norse discovery ===
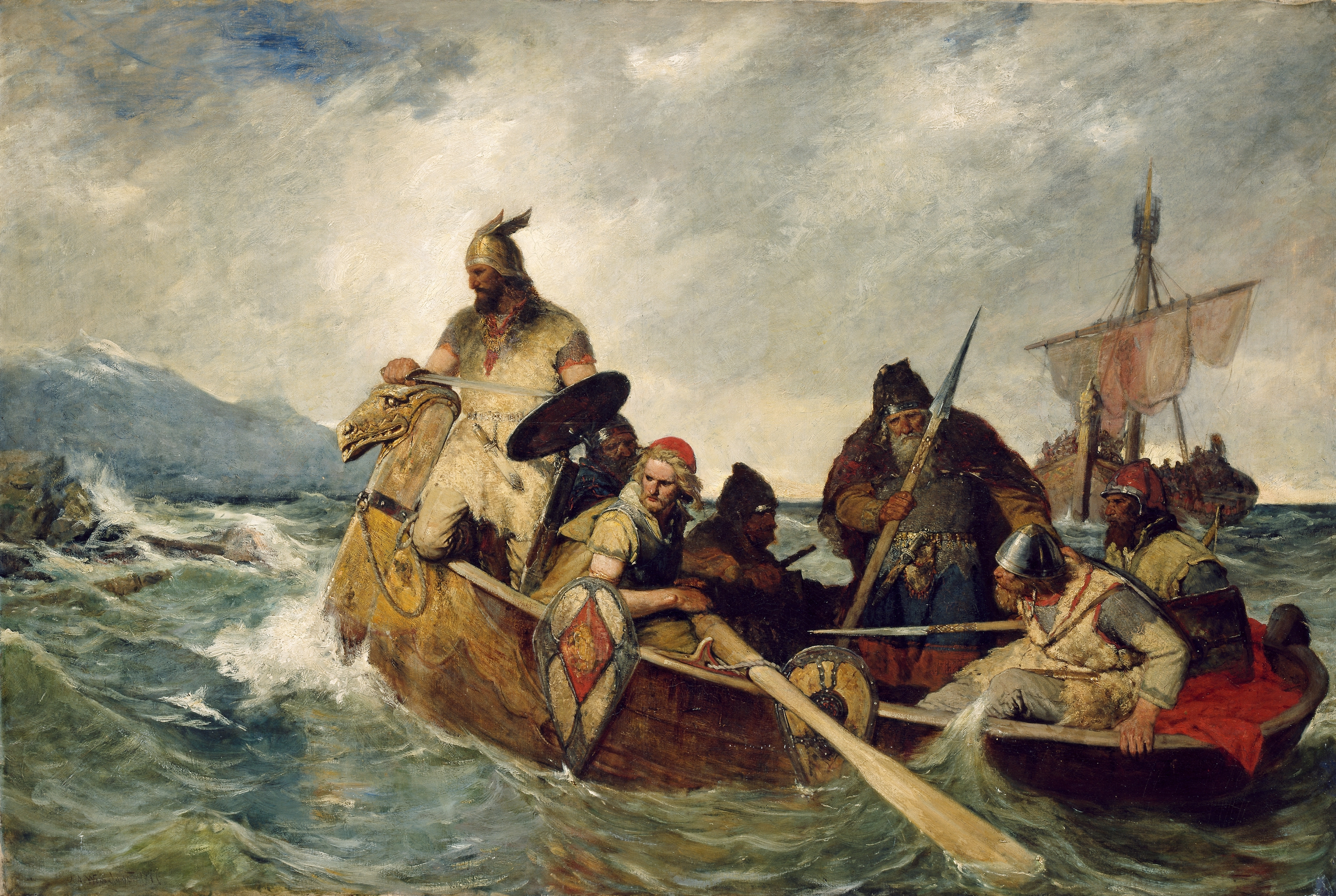
Norsemen landing in Iceland. Painting by Oscar Wergeland (1909).

According to the Landnámabók, Iceland was discovered by Naddodd, one of the first settlers in the Faroe Islands, who was sailing from Norway to the Faroes but lost his way and drifted to the east coast of Iceland. Naddodd called the country Snæland lit. 'Snowland'. Swedish sailor Garðar Svavarsson also accidentally drifted to the coast of Iceland. He discovered that the country was an island, called it Garðarshólmi lit. 'Garðar's islet' and stayed for the winter at Húsavík.

The first Norseman who deliberately sailed to Iceland was Hrafna-Flóki Vilgerðarson. Flóki settled for one winter at Barðaströnd. After the cold winter passed, the summer came and the whole island became green, which stunned Flóki. Realizing that this place was in fact habitable, despite the horribly cold winter, and full of useful resources, Flóki restocked his boat. He then returned east to Norway with resources and knowledge.

== Settlement (874–930) ==
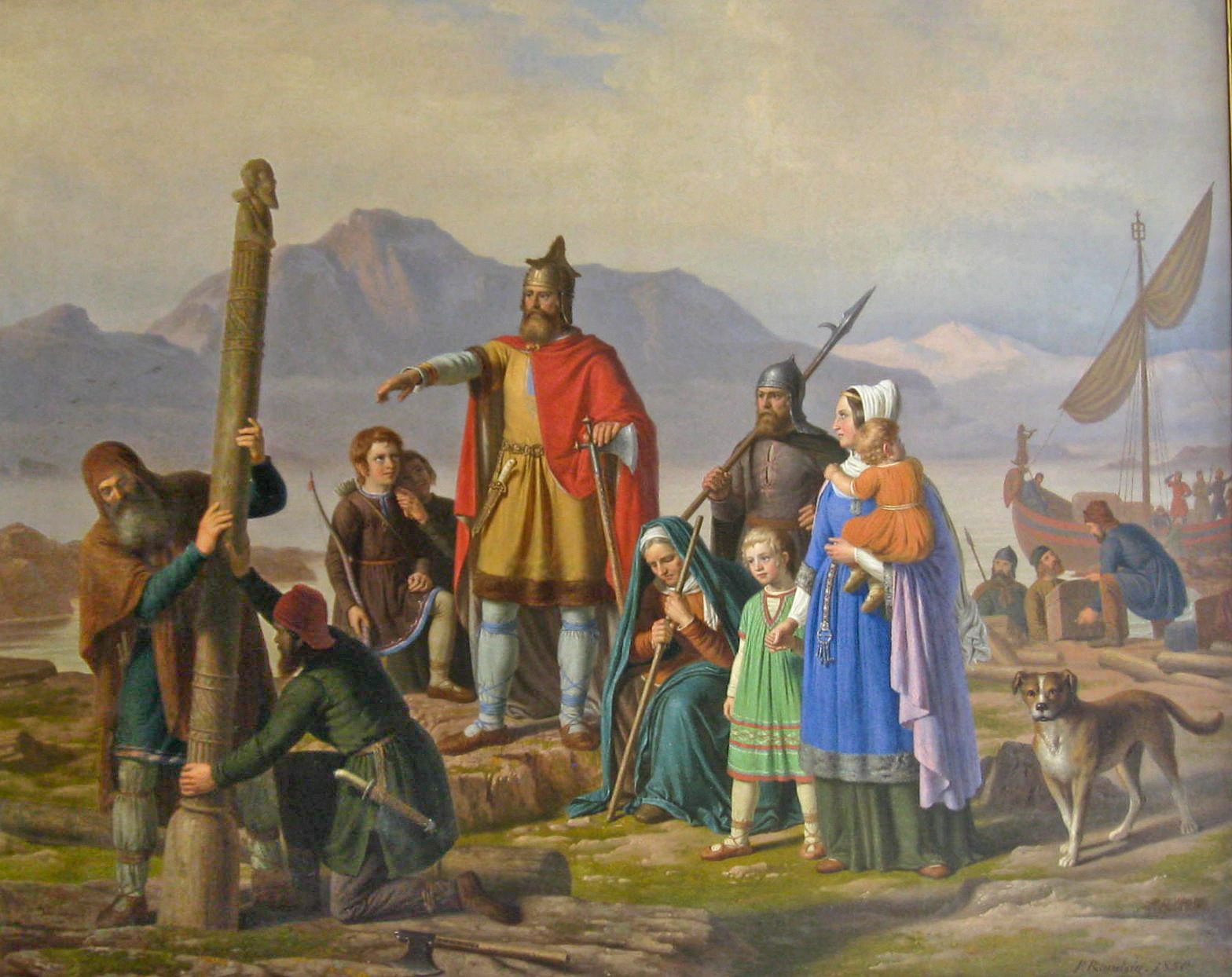
Ingólfur Arnarson commands his high seat pillars to be erected in this painting by Peter Raadsig.

The first permanent settler in Iceland is usually considered to have been a Norwegian chieftain named Ingólfur Arnarson and his wife, Hallveig Fróðadóttir. According to the Landnámabók, he threw two carved pillars (Öndvegissúlur) overboard as he neared land, vowing to settle wherever they landed. He then sailed along the coast until the pillars were found in the southwestern peninsula, now known as Reykjanesskagi. There he settled with his family around 874, in a place he named Reykjavík "Smoke Cove", probably from the geothermal steam rising from the earth. This place eventually became the capital and the largest city of modern Iceland. It is recognized, however, that Ingólfur Arnarson may not have been the first one to settle permanently in Iceland—that may have been Náttfari, one of Garðar Svavarsson's men who stayed behind when Garðar returned to Scandinavia.

Much of the information on Ingólfur comes from the Landnámabók, written some three centuries after the settlement. Archeological findings in Reykjavík are consistent with the date given there: there was a settlement in Reykjavík around 870.

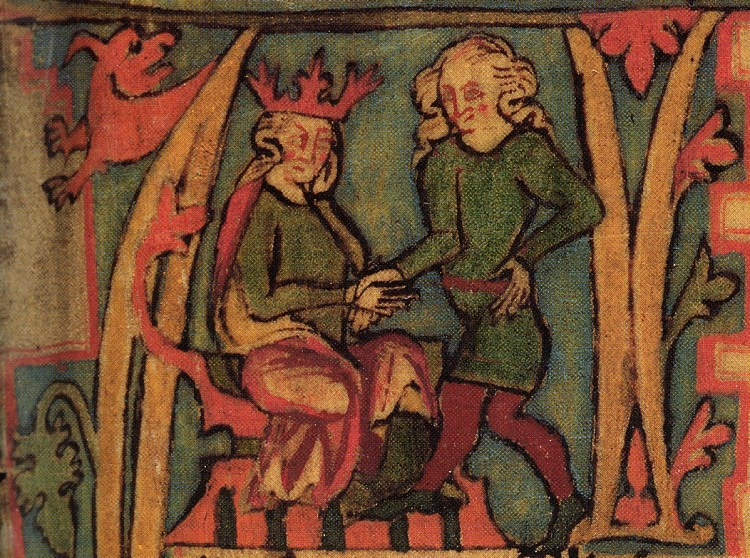
Harald Fairhair receives the kingdom of Norway from his father, Halfdan the Black.

According to Landnámabók, Ingólfur was followed by many more Norse chieftains, their families and slaves who settled all the habitable areas of the island in the next decades. Archeological evidence strongly suggests that the timing is roughly accurate; "that the whole country was occupied within a couple of decades towards the end of the 9th century." These people were primarily of Norwegian, Irish, and Scottish origin. Some of the Irish and Scots were slaves and servants of the Norse chiefs, according to the sagas of Icelanders, the Landnámabók, and other documents. Some settlers coming from the British Isles were "Hiberno-Norse," with cultural and family connections both to the coastal and island areas of Ireland and/or Scotland and to Norway.

The traditional explanation for the exodus from Norway is that people were fleeing the harsh rule of the Norwegian king Harald Fairhair, whom medieval literary sources credit with the unification of some parts of modern Norway during this period. Viking incursions into Britain were also expelled thoroughly during this time, potentially leading to a need for peaceful settlement in other lands. It is also believed that the western fjords of Norway were simply overcrowded in this period.

The settlement of Iceland is thoroughly recorded in the aforementioned Landnámabók, although the book was compiled in the early 12th century when at least 200 years had passed from the age of settlement. Ari Þorgilsson's Íslendingabók is generally considered more reliable as a source and is probably somewhat older, but it is far less thorough. It does say that Iceland was fully settled within 60 years, which likely means that all arable land had been claimed by various settlers.

In 2016, archaeologists uncovered a longhouse in Stöðvarfjörður that has been dated to as early as 800. Other, similar finds in Iceland have been dated to a similar time, preceding the traditional settlement date significantly.

== Commonwealth (930–1262) ==
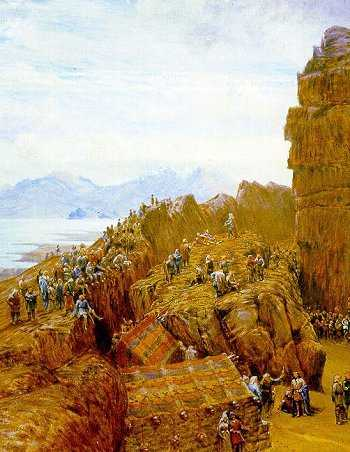
Nineteenth century depiction of a session of the Alþingi.

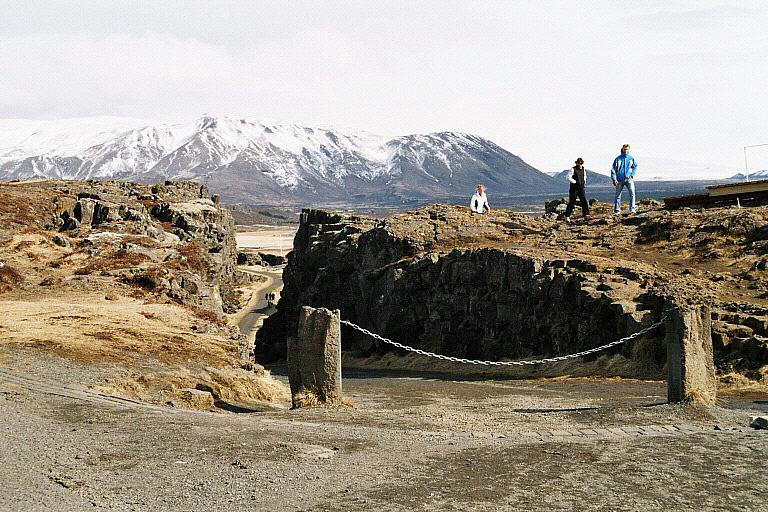
Þingvellir, seat of the Alþingi.

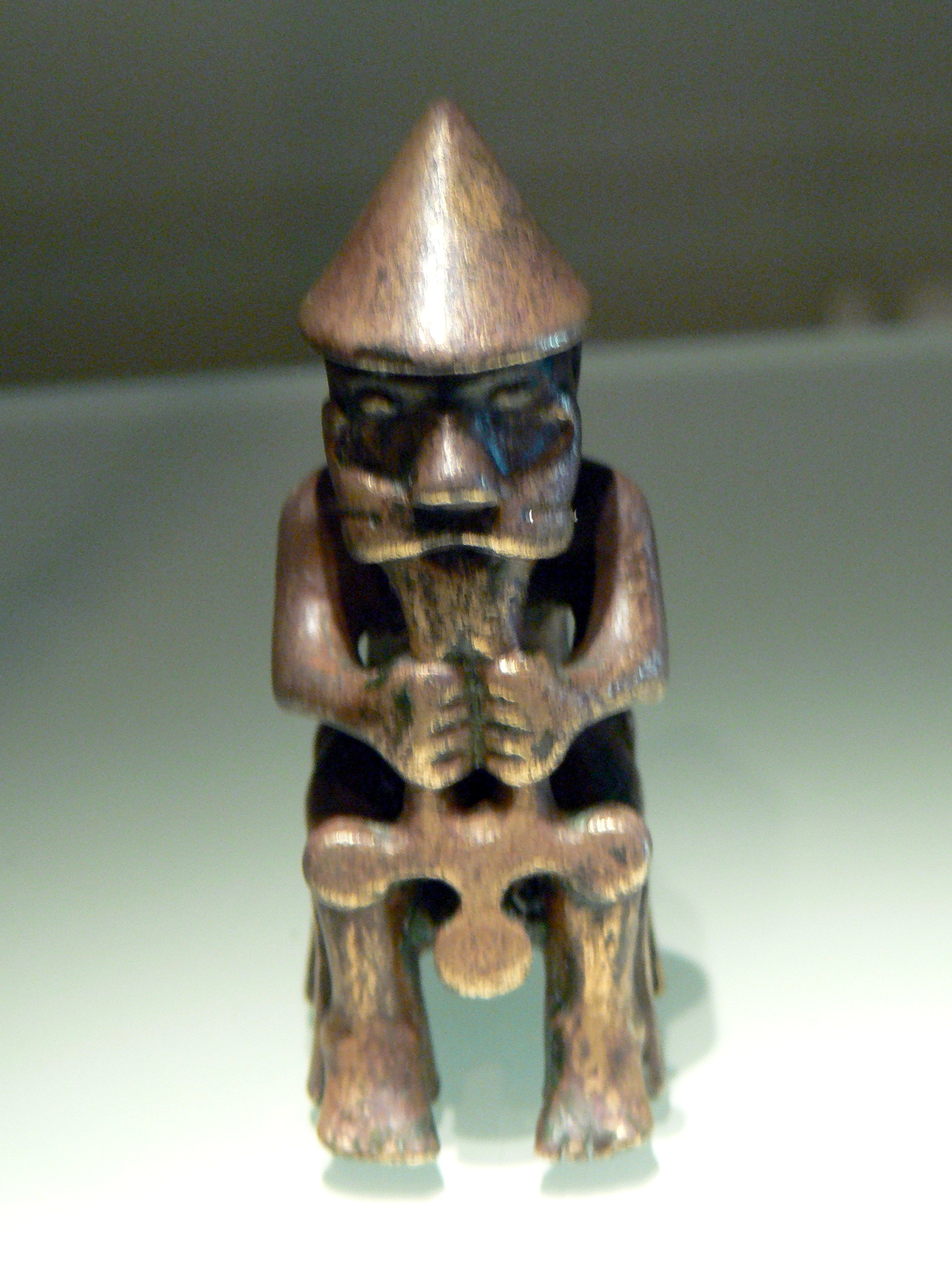
10th-century Eyrarland Statue of Thor, found in Iceland.

In 930, the ruling chiefs established an assembly called the Alþingi (Althing). The parliament convened each summer at Þingvellir, where chieftains (Goðorðsmenn or Goðar) amended laws, settled disputes and appointed juries to judge lawsuits. Laws were not written down but were instead memorized by an elected Lawspeaker (lǫgsǫgumaðr). The Alþingi is sometimes said to be the world's oldest existing parliament. Importantly, there was no central executive power, and therefore laws were enforced by the chieftains. This gave rise to feuds, which provided the writers of the sagas with plenty of material.

Iceland enjoyed a mostly uninterrupted period of growth in its commonwealth years. Settlements from that era have been found in southwest Greenland and eastern Canada, and sagas such as Saga of Erik the Red and Greenland saga speak of the settlers' exploits.

=== Christianisation ===
The settlers of Iceland were predominantly pagans and worshiped the Norse gods, among them Odin, Thor, Freyr, and Freyja. By the tenth century, political pressure from Europe to convert to Christianity mounted. As the end of the first millennium grew near, many prominent Icelanders had accepted the new faith.

Around 961, Eldgjá, a volcano in Southern Iceland, erupted 7.7 square miles of lava and lifted up huge clouds of sulfuric gas that affected all of Northern Europe and spanned out as far as Northern China. It also created rare hazes and multiple food crises in different parts of the world, including that year and many years that followed. Early Norse settlers in Iceland followed Paganism; however, after the Eldgjá volcano eruption, many thought of it as an act from God and started to convert to Christianity instead with the help of Alþingi. It is also believed they converted to Christianity to maintain peace with their European neighbors and the Catholic church.

In the year 1000, as a civil war between the religious groups seemed likely, the Alþingi appointed one of the chieftains, Thorgeir Ljosvetningagodi, to decide the issue of religion by arbitration. He decided that the country should convert to Christianity as a whole, but that pagans would be allowed to worship privately.

The first Icelandic bishop, Ísleifur Gissurarson, was consecrated by bishop Adalbert of Hamburg in 1056.

=== Civil war and the end of the commonwealth ===
Map of family clans in the Sturlung Era of Iceland

During the 11th and 12th centuries, the centralization of power had worn down the institutions of the commonwealth, as the former notable independence of local farmers and chieftains gave way to the growing power of a handful of families and their leaders. The period from around 1200 to 1262 is generally known as the Age of the Sturlungs. This refers to Sturla Þórðarson and his sons, Sighvatr Sturluson, and Snorri Sturluson, who were one of two main clans fighting for power over Iceland, causing havoc in a land inhabited almost entirely by farmers who could ill-afford to travel far from their farms, across the island to fight for their leaders.

In 1220, Snorri Sturluson became a vassal of Haakon IV of Norway; his nephew Sturla Sighvatsson also became a vassal in 1235. Sturla used the power and influence of the Sturlungar family clan to wage war against the other clans in Iceland. The Norwegian king's power of Iceland increased over the course of the 13th century. After decades of internal conflict, the Icelandic chieftains agreed to accept the sovereignty of Norway and signed the Old Covenant (Gamli sáttmáli) establishing a union with the Norwegian monarchy. The end of the Icelandic Commonwealth is typically dated to the signing of the Old Covenant (1262–1264) or to the adoption of Jónsbók in 1281.

The period also saw the staðamál, two major disputes over whether secular aristocrats should benefit from the tithes of proprietary churches they had founded. The latter, concluded in 1297, saw a significant shift of wealth and power from the aristocracy to the Church, which was increasingly independent of secular influence.

== Iceland under Norwegian and Danish kings (1262–1944) ==
=== Norwegian rule ===
Norwegian Iceland Norska Ísland (Icelandic)
- 1262–1814
- Flag Coat of arms

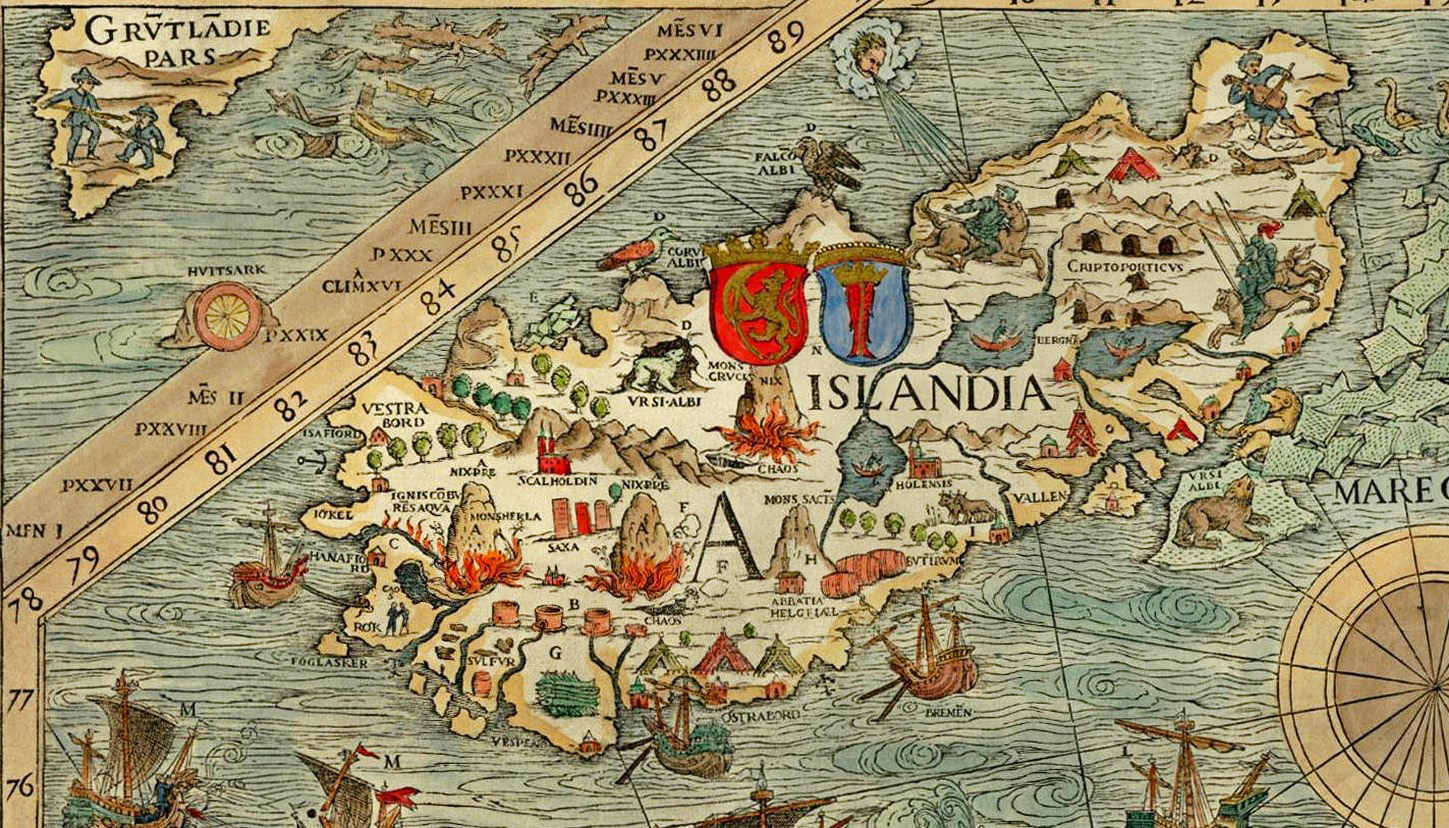
- Common languages: Icelandic
- Religion: 1262–1522; Catholic; 1524–1814; Church of Iceland
- History
  - Established: 1262
  - Disestablished: 1814
| Preceded by | Succeeded by |
| Commonwealth of Iceland | Danish Iceland |

Little changed in the decades following the treaty. Norway's consolidation of power in Iceland was slow, and the Althing intended to hold onto its legislative and judicial power. Nonetheless, the Christian clergy had unique opportunities to accumulate wealth via the tithe, and power gradually shifted to ecclesiastical authorities as Iceland's two bishops in Skálholt and Hólar acquired land at the expense of the old chieftains.

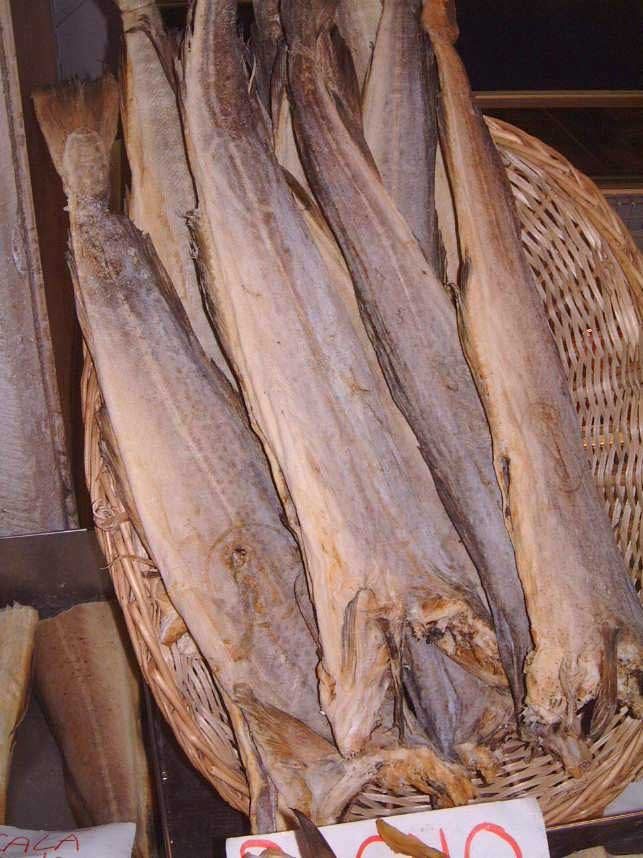
For a long period, stockfish trade made up the bulk of Iceland's exports.

Around the time Iceland became a vassal state of Norway, a climate shift occurred—a phenomenon now called the Little Ice Age. Areas near the Arctic Circle such as Iceland and Greenland began to have shorter growing seasons and colder winters. Since Iceland had marginal farmland in good times, the climate change resulted in hardship for the population. A serfdom-like institution called the vistarband developed, in which peasants were bound to landowners for a year at a time.

It became more difficult to raise barley, the primary cereal crop, and livestock required additional fodder to survive longer and colder winters. Icelanders began to trade for grain from continental Europe, which was an expensive proposition. Church fast days increased demand for dried codfish, which was easily caught and prepared for export, and the cod trade became an important part of the economy.

=== Kalmar Union ===
Danish Iceland Danska Ísland (Icelandic)
- 1524–1918 (turned into associated state)
- Royal Standard of Denmark (1731–1819) Royal Arms of Denmark & Norway (1699–1819)

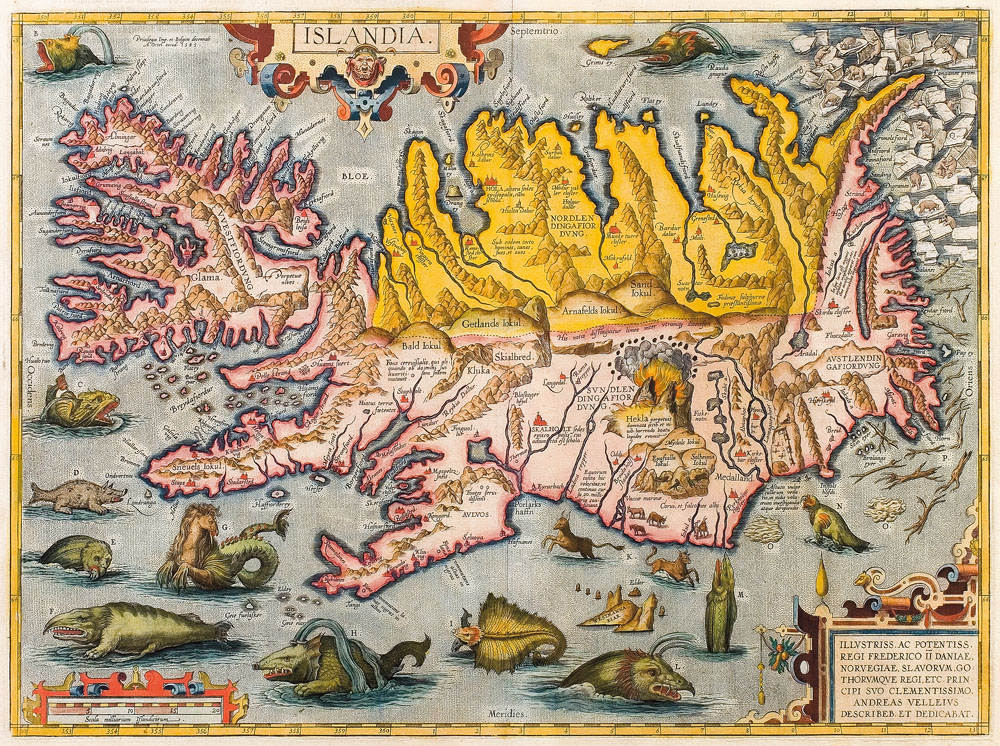
- Common languages: Icelandic
- Religion: 1524–1550; Catholic; 1550–1945; Lutheran
- Demonym: Icelandic
- History
  - Established: 1524
  - Disestablished: 1918 (turned into associated state)
| Preceded by | Succeeded by |
| Norwegian Iceland | Kingdom of Iceland |
- Today part of: Iceland

Iceland remained under Norwegian kingship until 1380, when the death of Olaf II of Denmark extinguished the Norwegian male royal line. Norway (and thus Iceland) then became part of the Kalmar Union, along with Sweden and Denmark, with Denmark as the dominant power. Unlike Norway, Denmark did not need Iceland's fish and homespun wool. This created a dramatic deficit in Iceland's trade. The small Greenland colony, established in the late 10th century, died out completely before 1500.

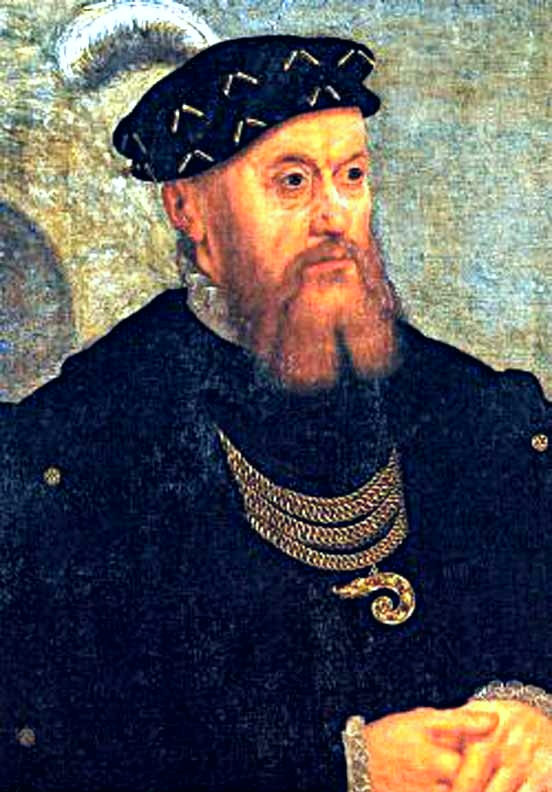
Christian III of Denmark

With the introduction of absolute monarchy in Denmark–Norway in 1660 under Frederick III of Denmark, the Icelanders relinquished their autonomy to the crown, including the right to initiate and consent to legislation. Denmark, however, did not provide much protection to Iceland, which was raided in 1627 by a Barbary pirate fleet that abducted almost 300 Icelanders into slavery, in an episode known as the Turkish Abductions.

After the end of the Kalmar Union, the royal government asserted greater control of Iceland. In particular, it took stronger actions to stop the involvement of English traders with Iceland.

=== Foreign merchants and fishermen ===
English and German merchants became more prominent in Iceland at the start of the 15th century. Some historians refer to the 15th century as the "English Age" in Iceland's history, due to the prominence of English traders and fishing fleets. What drew foreigners to Iceland was primarily fishing in the fruitful waters off the coast of Iceland. The Icelandic trade was important to some British ports; for example, in Hull, the Icelandic trade accounted for more than ten percent of Hull's total trade. The trade has been credited with raising Icelandic living standards.

The 16th century has been referred to as the "German Age" by Icelandic historians due to the prominence of German traders. The Germans did not engage in much fishing themselves, but they owned fishing boats, rented them to Icelanders and then bought the fish from Icelandic fishermen to export to the European Continent.

An illicit trade continued with foreigners after the Danes implemented a trade monopoly. Dutch and French traders became more prominent in the mid-17th century.

=== Reformation and Danish trade monopoly ===
By the middle of the 16th century, Christian III of Denmark began to impose Lutheranism on his subjects. Jón Arason and Ögmundur Pálsson, the Catholic bishops of Skálholt and Hólar respectively, opposed Christian's efforts at promoting the Protestant Reformation in Iceland. Ögmundur was deported by Danish officials in 1541, but Jón Arason put up a fight.

Opposition to the reformation ended in 1550 when Jón Arason was captured after being defeated in the Battle of Sauðafell by loyalist forces under the leadership of Daði Guðmundsson. Jón Arason and his two sons were subsequently beheaded in Skálholt. Following this, the Icelanders became Lutherans and remain largely so to this day.

In 1602, Iceland was forbidden to trade with countries other than Denmark, by order of the Danish government, which at this time pursued mercantilist policies. The Danish–Icelandic Trade Monopoly remained in effect until 1786.

=== The eruption of Laki ===
In the 18th century, climatic conditions in Iceland reached an all-time low since the original settlement. On top of this, Laki erupted in 1783, spitting out 12.5 cubic kilometres (3.0 cu mi) of lava. Floods, ash, and fumes killed 9,000 people and 80% of the livestock. The ensuing starvation killed a quarter of Iceland's population. This period is known as the Móðuharðindin or "Mist Hardships".

=== Danish Iceland in the beginning of the 19th century ===
In 1809 Danish adventurer Jørgen Jørgensen arrived in Iceland, declared the country independent from Denmark–Norway and pronounced himself its ruler. However, with the arrival of HMS Talbot two months later, Danish rule in Iceland was restored and Jørgensen was arrested.

When the two kingdoms of Denmark and Norway were separated by the Treaty of Kiel in 1814 following the Napoleonic Wars, Denmark kept Iceland, as well as Faroe and Greenland, as dependencies.

=== Independence movement ===
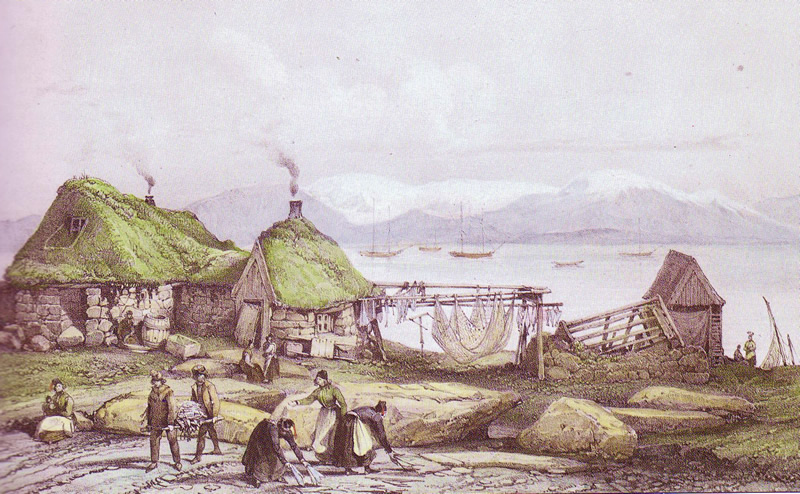
Fisherman's hut in Iceland

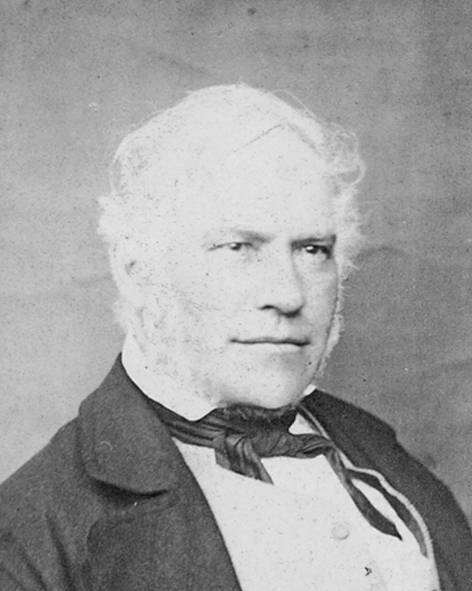
Jón Sigurðsson.

Throughout the 19th century, the country's climate continued to grow worse, resulting in mass emigration to the New World, particularly Manitoba in Canada. However, a new national consciousness was revived in Iceland, inspired by romantic nationalist ideas from continental Europe. This revival was spearheaded by the Fjölnismenn, a group of Danish-educated Icelandic intellectuals.

An independence movement developed under the leadership of a lawyer named Jón Sigurðsson. In 1843, a new Althing was founded as a consultative assembly. It claimed continuity with the Althing of the Icelandic Commonwealth, which had remained for centuries as a judicial body and had been abolished in 1800.

=== Home rule and sovereignty ===
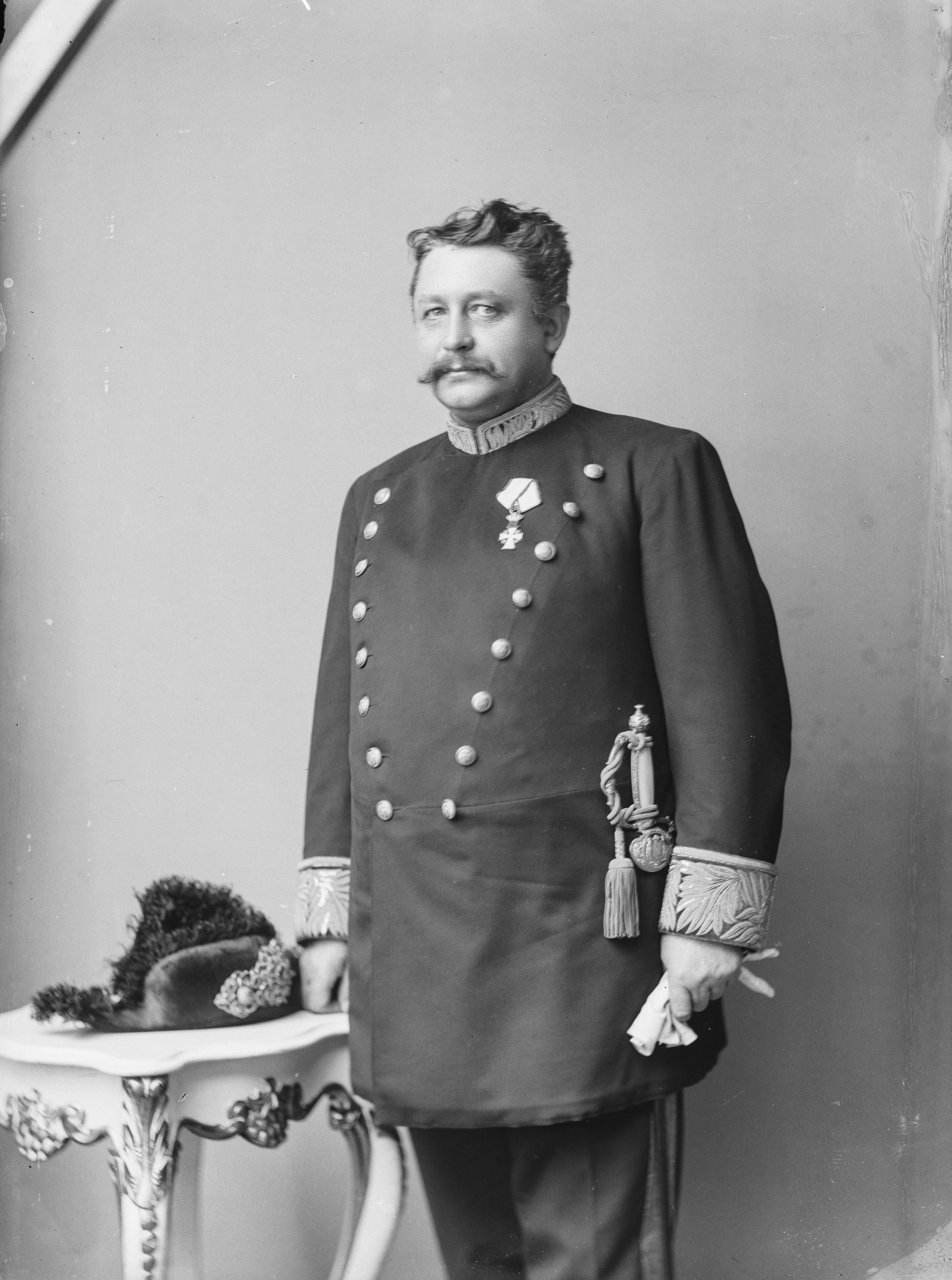
Hannes Hafstein, first Prime Minister of Iceland and the first Icelander to be appointed to the Danish Cabinet as the Minister for Iceland

In 1874, a thousand years after the first acknowledged settlement, Denmark granted Iceland a constitution and limited home rule over domestic matters, which was expanded in 1904. The constitution was revised in 1903, and a minister for Icelandic affairs, residing in Reykjavík, was made responsible to the Althing, the first of whom was Hannes Hafstein.

Iceland and Denmark signed the Danish–Icelandic Act of Union on 1 December 1918, recognizing the Kingdom of Iceland as a fully sovereign state joined with Denmark in a personal union with the Danish king. Iceland established its own flag. Denmark was to represent its foreign affairs and defense interests. Iceland had no military or naval forces, and Denmark was to give notice to other countries that it was permanently neutral. The act would be up for revision in 1940 and could be revoked three years later if agreement was not reached. By the 1930s the consensus in Iceland was to seek complete independence by 1944 at the latest.

=== World War I ===
In the quarter of a century preceding the war, Iceland had prospered. However, Iceland became more isolated during World War I and suffered a significant decline in living standards. The treasury became highly indebted, and there was a shortage of food and fears over an imminent famine.

Iceland was part of neutral Denmark during the war. Icelanders were, in general, sympathetic to the cause of the Allies. Iceland also traded significantly with the United Kingdom during the war, as Iceland found itself within its sphere of influence. In their attempts to stop the Icelanders from trading with the Germans indirectly, the British imposed costly and time-consuming constraints on Icelandic exports going to the Nordic countries. There is no evidence of any German plans to invade Iceland during the war.

1,245 Icelanders, Icelandic Americans, and Icelandic Canadians were registered as soldiers during World War I. 989 fought for Canada and 256 for the United States. 391 of the combatants were born in Iceland, the rest were of Icelandic descent. 10 women of Icelandic descent and 4 women born in Iceland served as nurses for the Allies during World War I. At least 144 of the combatants died during World War I (96 in combat, 19 from wounds suffered during combat, 2 from accidents, and 27 from disease), 61 of them were Iceland-born. Ten men were taken as prisoners of war by the German Empire.

The war had a lasting impact on Icelandic society and Iceland's external relations. It led to major government interference in the marketplace that lasted until the post-World War II period. Iceland's competent governance of internal affairs and relations with other states—while relations with Denmark were interrupted during the war—showed that Iceland was capable of acquiring further powers, which resulted in Denmark recognizing Iceland as a fully sovereign state in 1918. It has been argued that the thirst for news of the war helped Morgunblaðið to gain a dominant position among Icelandic newspapers.

=== The Great Depression ===
Icelandic post-World War I prosperity ended with the outbreak of the Great Depression, a severe worldwide economic crash starting after the Wall Street crash of 24 October 1929.

The depression hit Iceland hard as the value of exports plummeted. The total value of Icelandic exports fell from 74 million kronur in 1929 to 48 million kronur in 1932, and did not rise again to the pre-1930 level until after 1939. Government involvement in the economy increased: "Imports were regulated, trade with foreign currency was monopolized by state-owned banks, and loan capital was largely distributed by state-regulated funds". The outbreak of the Spanish Civil War (July 1936) cut Iceland's exports of saltfish by half, and the depression lasted in Iceland until the outbreak of World War II, when prices for fish exports soared.

=== World War II ===
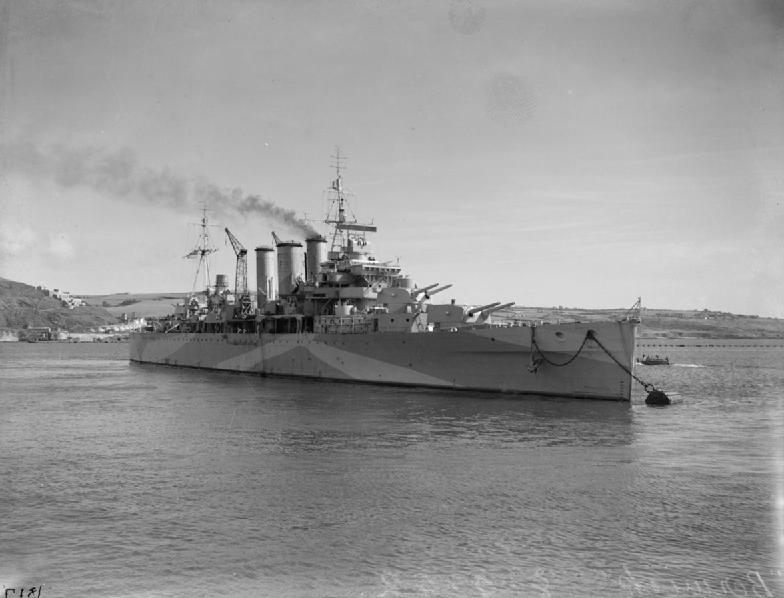
HMS Berwick led the British invasion of Iceland.

With war looming in March 1939 (Nazi Germany occupied Czechoslovakia), Iceland realized its exposed position would be very dangerous in wartime. An all-party government was formed, and Lufthansa's request for civilian airplane landing rights was rejected. German ships were all about, however, until the British blockade of Germany put a stop to that when Hitler started war on 1 September 1939 by beginning the Invasion of Poland. Iceland demanded Britain allow it to trade with Germany, to no avail.

The occupation of Denmark by Nazi Germany began on 9 April 1940 (Operation Weserübung), severing communications between Iceland and Denmark. As a result, on 10 April, the Parliament of Iceland took temporary control of foreign affairs (setting up what would be the forerunner of the Ministry for Foreign Affairs) and the Coast Guard. Parliament also elected a provisional governor, Sveinn Björnsson, who later became the Republic's first president. Iceland became de facto fully sovereign with these actions. At the time, Icelanders and the Danish King considered this state of affairs to be temporary and believed that Iceland would return these powers to Denmark when the occupation was over.

Iceland turned down British offers of protection after the occupation of Denmark, because that would have violated Iceland's neutrality. Britain and the U.S. opened direct diplomatic relations, as did Sweden and Norway. The German takeover of Norway left Iceland highly exposed; Britain decided it could not risk a German takeover of Iceland. On 10 May 1940, British military forces began an invasion of Iceland when they sailed into Reykjavík harbour in Operation Fork. There was no resistance, but the government protested against what it called a "flagrant violation" of Icelandic neutrality, though Prime Minister Hermann Jónasson called on Icelanders to treat the British troops with politeness, as if they were guests. They behaved accordingly, and there were no mishaps. The occupation of Iceland lasted throughout the war.

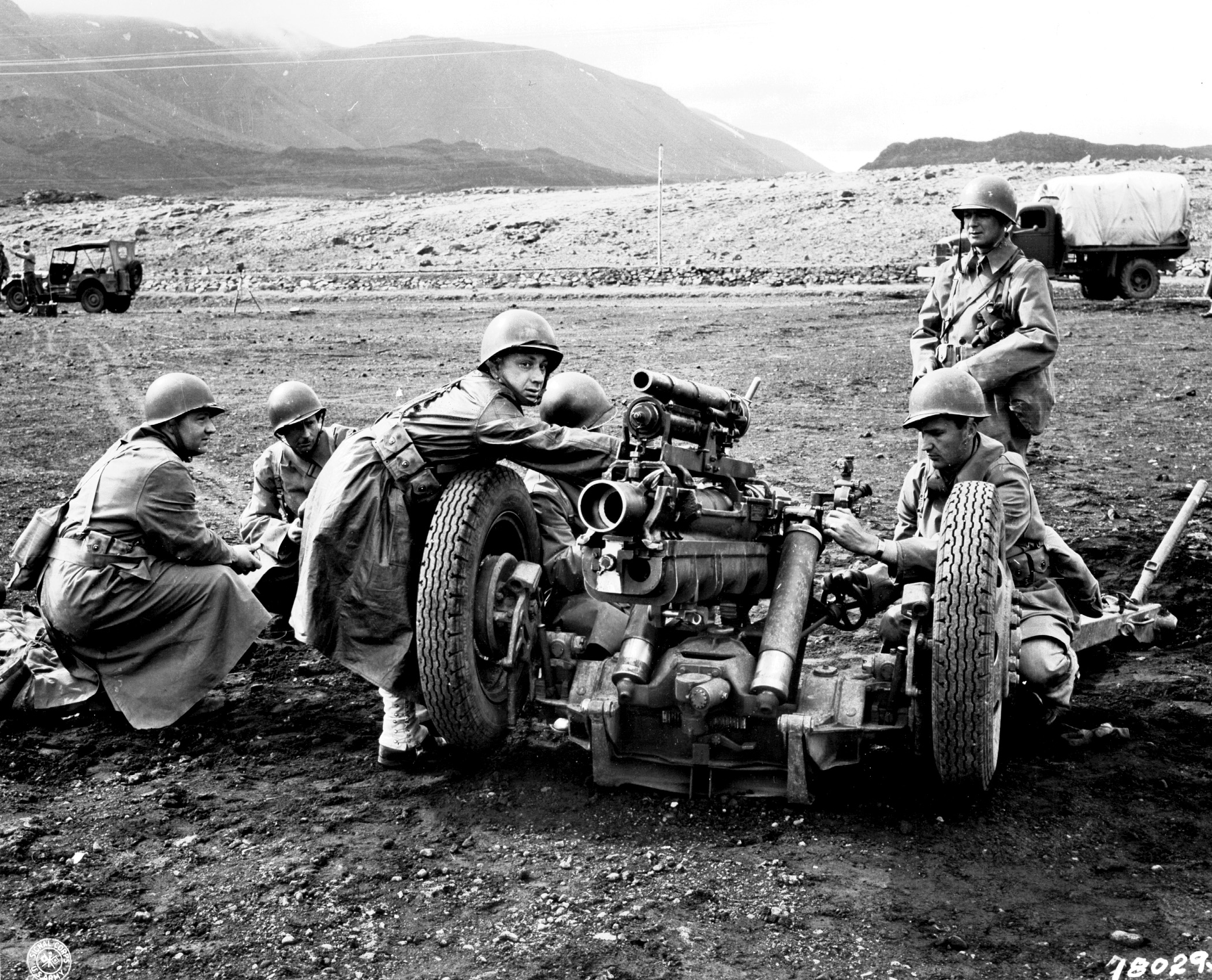
US Army training in Iceland in June 1943.

At the peak, the British had 25,000 troops stationed in Iceland, all but eliminating unemployment in the Reykjavík area and other strategically important places. In July 1941, responsibility for Iceland's occupation and defence passed to the United States under a U.S.-Icelandic agreement which included a provision that the U.S. recognize Iceland's absolute independence. The British were replaced by up to 40,000 Americans, who outnumbered all adult Icelandic men. (At the time, Iceland had a population of around 120,000.)

Approximately 159 Icelanders' lives have been confirmed to have been lost in World War II hostilities. Most were killed on cargo and fishing vessels sunk by German aircraft, U-boats or mines. An additional 70 Icelanders died at sea, but it has not been confirmed whether they lost their lives as a result of hostilities.

The occupation of Iceland by the British and the Americans proved to be an economic boom, as the occupiers injected money into the Icelandic economy and launched various projects. This eradicated unemployment in Iceland and raised wages considerably. According to one study, "by the end of World War II, Iceland had been transformed from one of Europe’s poorest countries to one of the world’s wealthiest."

== Republic of Iceland (1944–present) ==
=== Founding of the republic ===
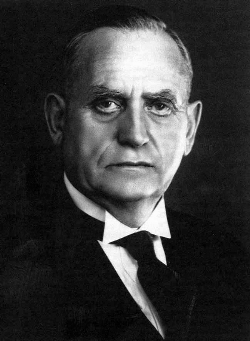
Sveinn Björnsson, the first President of Iceland.

On 31 December 1943, the Act of Union agreement expired after 25 years. Beginning on 20 May 1944, Icelanders voted in a four-day plebiscite on whether to terminate the personal union with the King of Denmark and establish a republic. The vote was 97% in favour of ending the union and 95% in favour of the new republican constitution. Iceland became an independent republic on 17 June 1944, with Sveinn Björnsson as its first president. Denmark was still occupied by Germany at the time. Danish King Christian X sent a message of congratulations to the Icelandic people.

Iceland had prospered during the course of the war, amassing considerable currency reserves in foreign banks. In addition to this, the country received the most Marshall Aid per capita of any European country in the immediate postwar years (at US$209, with the war-ravaged Netherlands a distant second at US$109).

The new republican government, led by an unlikely three-party majority cabinet made up of conservatives (the Independence Party, Sjálfstæðisflokkurinn), social democrats (the Social Democratic Party, Alþýðuflokkurinn), and socialists (People's Unity Party – Socialist Party, Sósíalistaflokkurinn), decided to put the funds into a general renovation of the fishing fleet, the building of fish processing facilities, the construction of a cement and fertilizer factory, and a general modernization of agriculture. These actions were aimed at keeping Icelanders' standard of living as high as it had become during the prosperous war years.

The government's fiscal policy was strictly Keynesian, and their aim was to create the necessary industrial infrastructure for a prosperous developed country. It was considered essential to keep unemployment down and to protect the export fishing industry through currency manipulation and other means. Because of the country's dependence both on reliable fish catches and foreign demand for fish products, Iceland's economy remained unstable well into the 1990s, when the country's economy was greatly diversified.

=== NATO membership, US defense agreement, and the Cold War ===
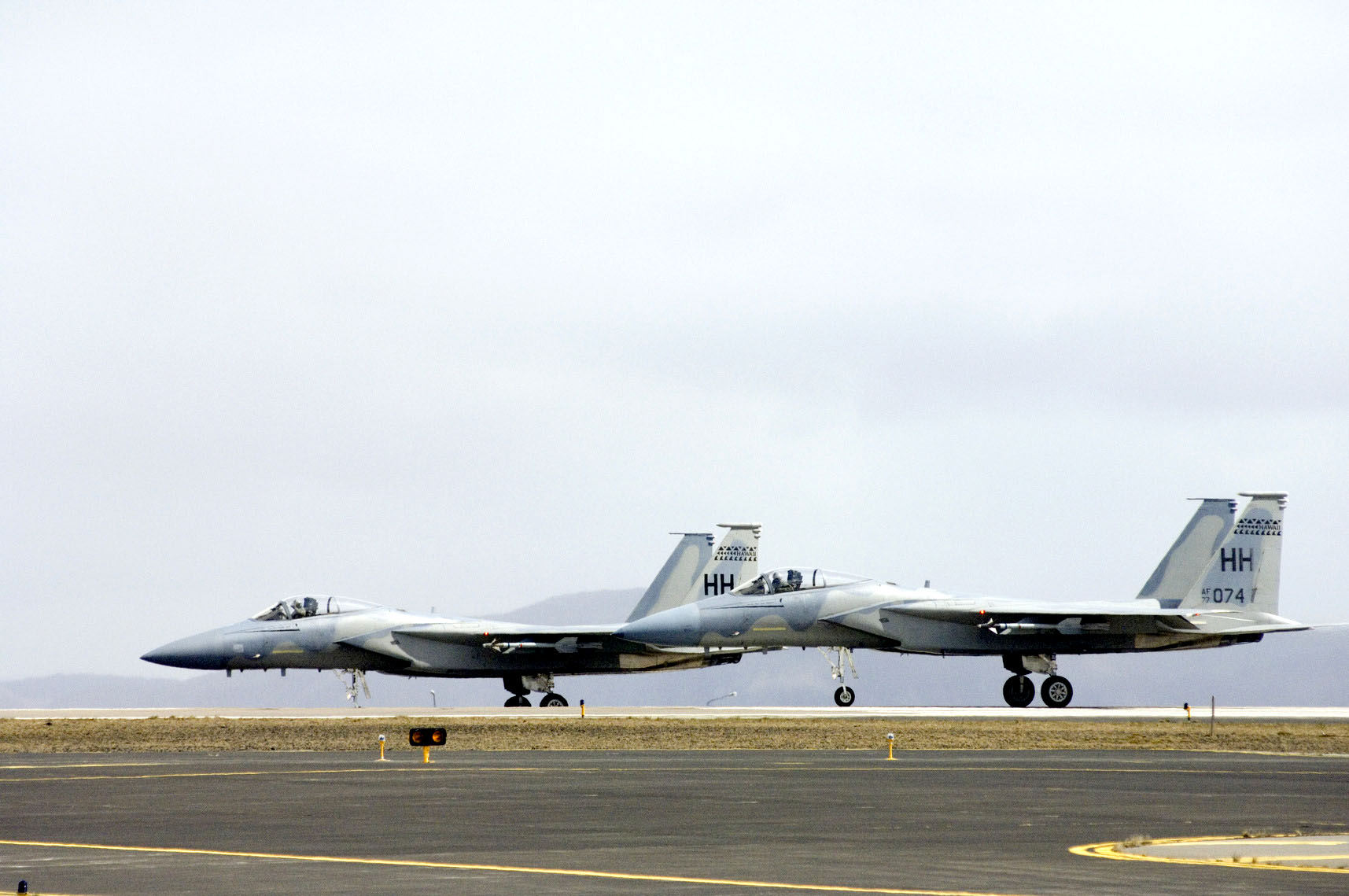
United States F-15 fighter jets at Keflavík Air Base.

In October 1946, the Icelandic and United States governments agreed to terminate U.S. responsibility for the defense of Iceland, but the United States retained certain rights at Keflavík, such as the right to re-establish a military presence there, should war threaten. Around that time, the Cold War began.

Iceland became a charter member of the North Atlantic Treaty Organization (NATO) on 30 March 1949, with the reservation that it would never take part in offensive action against another nation. The membership came amid an anti-NATO riot in Iceland. After the outbreak of the Korean War in 1950, and pursuant to the request of NATO military authorities, the United States and Iceland agreed that the United States should again take responsibility for Iceland's defense. This agreement, signed on 5 May 1951, was the authority for the controversial U.S. military presence in Iceland, which remained until 2006. The U.S. base served as a hub for transports and communications to Europe, a key chain in the GIUK gap, a monitor of Soviet submarine activity, and a linchpin in the early warning system for incoming Soviet attacks and interceptor of Soviet reconnaissance bombers. Although U.S. forces no longer maintain a military presence in Iceland, the alliance with NATO and the Bilateral Defense Agreement of 1951 between Iceland and the United States remain fundamental pillars of Iceland's security and defense. Iceland is a country without a military and has emphasized a comprehensive and multilateral approach in security affairs and is a member of key organizations, such as the United Nations, NATO, and the OSCE. Iceland has retained strong ties to the other Nordic countries. As a consequence, Norway, Denmark, Germany, and other European nations have increased their defense and rescue cooperation with Iceland since the withdrawal of U.S. forces.

According to a 2018 study in the Scandinavian Journal of History, Iceland benefited massively from its relationship with the United States during the Cold War. The United States provided extensive economic patronage, advocated on Iceland's behalf in international organizations, allowed Iceland to violate the rules of international organizations, and helped Iceland to victory in the Cod Wars. Despite this, the relationship with the United States was contentious in Icelandic domestic politics, leaving some scholars to describe Iceland as a "rebellious ally" and "reluctant ally." Iceland repeatedly threatened to leave NATO or cancel the US defence agreement during the Cold War, which was one reason why the United States went to great lengths to please the Icelanders.

=== Cod Wars ===
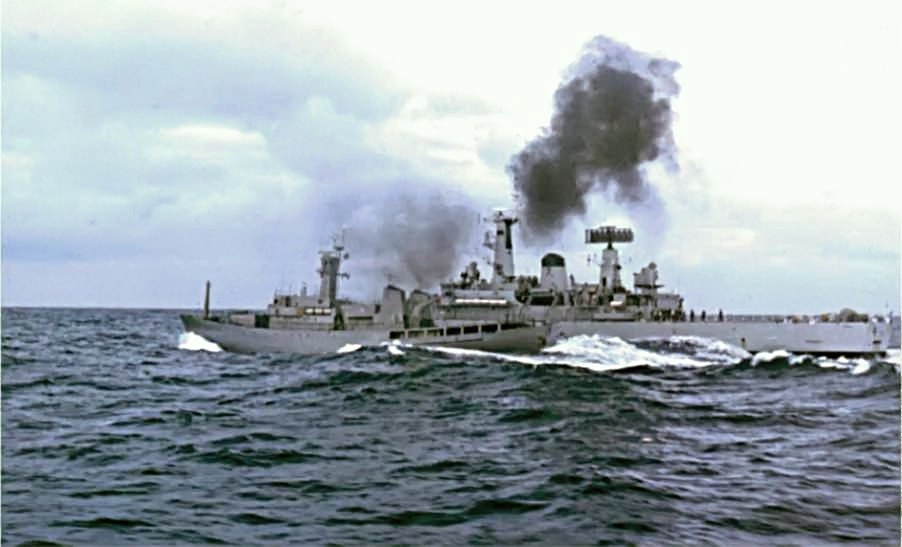
Icelandic Coast Guard and Royal Navy vessels clash in the North Atlantic.

The Cod Wars were a series of militarized interstate disputes between Iceland and the United Kingdom from the 1950s to the mid-1970s. The Proto Cod War (1952–1956) revolved around Iceland's extension of its fishery limits from 3 to 4 nautical miles. The First Cod War (1958–1961) was fought over Iceland's extension from 4 to 12 nautical miles (7 to 22 km). The Second Cod War (1972–1973) occurred when Iceland extended the limits to 50 miles (93 km). The Third Cod War (1975–1976) was fought over Iceland's extension of its fishery limits to 200 miles (370 km). Icelandic patrol ships and British trawlers clashed in all four Cod Wars. The Royal Navy was sent to the contested waters in the last three Cod Wars, leading to highly publicized clashes.

During these disputes, Iceland threatened closure of the U.S. base at Keflavík, and the withdrawal of its NATO membership. Due to Iceland's strategic importance during the Cold War, it was important for the U.S. and NATO to maintain the base on Icelandic soil and to keep Iceland as a member of NATO. While the Icelandic government did follow through on its threat to break off diplomatic relations with the UK during the Third Cod War, it never went through on its threats to close the U.S. base or to withdraw from NATO.

It is rare for militarized interstate disputes of this magnitude and intensity to occur between two democracies with as close economic, cultural, and institutional ties as Iceland and the UK.

=== EEA membership, economic reform and evolving U.S. defense cooperation ===
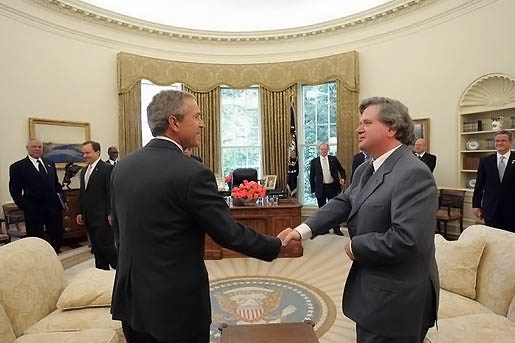
Prime Minister of Iceland Davíð Oddsson with United States President George W. Bush in 2004.

In 1991, the Independence Party, led by Davíð Oddsson, formed a coalition government with the Social Democrats. This government set in motion market liberalisation policies, privatising a number of state-owned companies. Iceland then became a member of the European Economic Area in 1994. Economic stability increased and previously chronic inflation was drastically reduced.

In 1993 Iceland and the United States reassessed the mutual defense requirements at Keflavík, based on the 1951 bilateral defense agreement. The results, contained in an understanding signed on January 4 1994, called for reductions in force levels to reflect the relaxation of tension in the North Atlantic region.

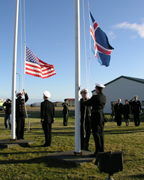
The flag of Iceland being raised and the flag of the United States being lowered as the U.S. hands over the Keflavík Air Base to the Government of Iceland.

In 1995, the Independence Party formed a coalition government with the Progressive Party. This government continued with free market policies, privatising two commercial banks and the state-owned telecom Landssíminn. Corporate income tax was reduced to 18% (from around 50% at the beginning of the decade), inheritance tax was greatly reduced, and the net wealth tax was abolished. A system of individual transferable quotas in the Icelandic fisheries, first introduced in the late 1970s, was further developed. The coalition government remained in power through elections in 1999 and 2003. In 2004, Davíð Oddsson stepped down as prime minister after 13 years in office. Oddsson was Iceland's longest-serving prime minister and held the job from 1991 until 2004. Halldór Ásgrímsson, leader of the Progressive Party, took over as prime minister from 2004 to 2006, followed by Geir H. Haarde, Davíð Oddsson's successor as leader of the Independence Party.

Following a recession in the early 1990s, economic growth was considerable, averaging about 4% per year from 1994. The governments of the 1990s and 2000s adhered to a staunch but domestically controversial pro-U.S. foreign policy, lending nominal support to the NATO action in the Kosovo War and signing up as a member of the Coalition of the willing during the 2003 invasion of Iraq.

In March 2006, the US President Bush announced that the U.S. intended to withdraw the greater part of the Icelandic Defence Force. On 12 August 2006, the last four F-15's left Icelandic airspace. The United States closed the Keflavík Air Base in September 2006. A Joint Understanding was also negotiated in which both sides affirm their continuing commitment to the 1951 Defense Agreement. The Joint Understanding also lists bilateral activities designed to create a basis for future cooperation between Iceland and the United States in the areas of defense and security. In 2016, it was reported that the United States (Presidency of Barack Obama) was considering re-opening the base.

Following election in May 2007, the Independence Party, headed by Haarde, remained in government, albeit in a new coalition with the Social Democratic Alliance.

=== Financial crisis ===
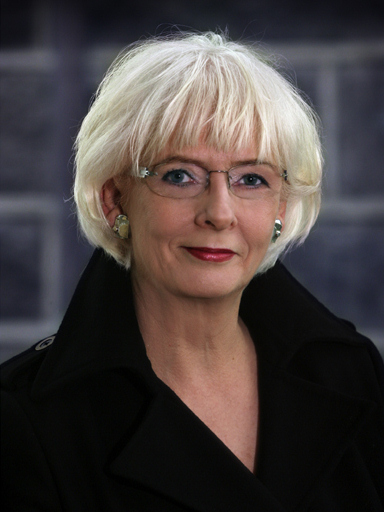
Prime Minister Jóhanna Sigurðardóttir, the world's first openly homosexual head of government of the modern era.

In October 2008, the Icelandic banking system collapsed, prompting Iceland to seek large loans from the International Monetary Fund and friendly countries. Widespread protests in late 2008 and early 2009 resulted in the resignation of the Haarde government, which was replaced on 1 February 2009 by a coalition government led by the Social Democratic Alliance and the Left-Green Movement. Social Democrat minister Jóhanna Sigurðardóttir was appointed prime minister, becoming the world's first openly homosexual head of government of the modern era. An Election took place in April 2009, and a continuing coalition government consisting of the Social Democrats and the Left-Green Movement was established in May 2009.

The financial crisis gave rise to the Icesave dispute, where Iceland on the one hand and the United Kingdom and Netherlands on the other disputed whether Iceland was obligated to repay British and Dutch depositors who lost their savings when Icesave collapsed.

The crisis resulted in the greatest migration from Iceland since 1887, with a net exodus of 5,000 people in 2009.

==== 2010 eruptions of Eyjafjallajökull ====
In 2010, a series of volcanic events at Eyjafjallajökull in Iceland caused enormous disruption to air travel across Western Europe. The eruption was relatively small, but its impact was massive, leading to an air travel chaos for almost one month, because of a plume of volcanic ash over nine kilometers into the sky.

=== Since 2012 ===
Iceland's economy stabilized under the government of Jóhanna Sigurðardóttir, and grew by 1.6% in 2012, but many Icelanders remained unhappy with the state of the economy and government austerity policies; the centre-right Independence Party was returned to power, in coalition with the Progressive Party, in the 2013 elections. In September 2017, the 9-month-old center-right coalition of Prime Minister Bjarni Benediktsson, leader of the Independence Party, collapsed after one party, a small centrist Bright Future, left the government. However, the ruling centre-right parties lost their majority after a tight 2017 election. On 30 November 2017, Katrín Jakobsdóttir became Iceland's new prime minister despite the fact her party, Left-Green Movement, came second in the election - behind the Independence Party.

On 1 August 2016, Guðni Th. Jóhannesson became the new president of Iceland. He was re-elected with an overwhelming majority of the vote in the 2020 presidential election.

After the 2021 parliamentary election, the new government was, just like the previous government, a tri-party coalition of the Independence Party, the Progressive Party and the Left-Green Movement, headed by Prime Minister Katrín Jakobsdóttir. In April 2024, Bjarni Benediktsson of the Independence party succeeded Katrín Jakobsdóttir as prime minister. In June 2024, Halla Tomasdottir won Iceland’s presidential election to become the country’s second female president. In November 2024, centre-left Social Democratic Alliance became the biggest party in a snap election, meaning Social Democratic Kristrun Frostadottir became the next Prime Minister of Iceland.

== Historiography ==
=== Division of history into named periods ===
While it is convenient to divide history into named periods, it is also misleading because the course of human events neither starts nor ends abruptly in most cases, and movements and influences often overlap. One period in Icelandic history, as Gunnar Karlsson describes, can be considered the period from 930 CE to 1262–1264, when there was no central government or leader, political power being characterised by chieftains ("goðar"). This period is referred to therefore as the þjóðveldisöld or goðaveldisöld (National or Chieftain State) period by Icelandic authors, and the Old Commonwealth or Freestate by English ones.

There is little consensus on how to divide Icelandic history. Gunnar's own book A Brief History of Iceland (2010) has 33 chapters with considerable overlap in dates. Jón J. Aðils' 1915 text, Íslandssaga (A History of Iceland) uses ten periods:

- Landnámsöld (Settlement Age) c. 870–930
- Söguöld (Saga Age) 930–1030
- Íslenska kirkjan í elstu tíð (The early Icelandic church) 1030–1152
- Sturlungaöld (Sturlung Age) 1152–1262
- Ísland undir stjórn Noregskonunga og uppgangur kennimanna (Norwegian royal rule and the rise of the clergy) 1262–1400
- Kirkjuvald (Ecclesiastical power) 1400–1550
- Konungsvald (Royal authority) 1550–1683
- Einveldi og einokun (Absolutism and monopoly trading) 1683–1800
- Viðreisnarbarátta (Campaign for restoration [of past glories]) 1801–1874
- Framsókn (Progress) 1875–1915

In another of Gunnar's books, Iceland's 1100 Years (2000), Icelandic history is divided into four periods:

- Colonisation and Commonwealth c. 870–1262
- Under foreign rule 1262 – c. 1800
- A primitive society builds a state 1809–1918
- The great 20th-century transformation

These are based mainly on forms of government, except for the last which reflects mechanisation of the fishing industry.

== See also ==
- Military history of Iceland
- Politics of Iceland
- President of Iceland
- Prime Minister of Iceland
- Timeline of Icelandic history

== Bibliography ==
- Axel Kristinsson. "Is there any tangible proof that there were Irish monks in Iceland before the time of the Viking settlements?" (2005) in English in Icelandic
- Bergsteinn Jónsson and Björn Þorsteinsson. "Íslandssaga til okkar daga" Sögufélag. Reykjavík. (1991) (in Icelandic) ISBN 9979-9064-4-8
- Byock, Jesse. Medieval Iceland: Society, Sagas and Power University of California Press (1988) ISBN 0-520-06954-4 ISBN 0-226-52680-1
- Guðmundur Hálfdanarson;"Starfsmaður | Háskóli Íslands". Hug.hi.is. Archived from the original on 12 February 2009. "Historical Dictionary of Iceland" Scarecrow Press. Maryland, USA. (1997) ISBN 0-8108-3352-2
- Gunnar Karlsson. "History of Iceland" Univ. of Minneapolis. (2000) ISBN 0-8166-3588-9 "The History of Iceland (Gunnar Karlsson) – book review". Dannyreviews.com.
- Gunnar Karlsson. "Iceland's 1100 Years: History of a Marginal Society". Hurst. London. (2000) ISBN 1-85065-420-4.
- Gunnar Karlsson. "A Brief History of Iceland". Forlagið 2000. 2nd ed. 2010. Trans. Anna Yates. ISBN 978-9979-3-3164-3
- Helgi Skúli Kjartansson; "Helgi Skúli Kjartansson". Starfsfolk.khi.is. 26 September 2004. Archived from the original on 2 February 2009. "Ísland á 20. öld". Reykjavík. (2002) ISBN 9979-9059-7-2
- Sverrir Jakobsson. ‘The Process of State-Formation in Medieval Iceland’, Viator. Journal of Medieval and Renaissance Studies 40:2 (Autumn 2009), 151–70.
- Sverrir Jakobsson. The Territorialization of Power in the Icelandic Commonwealth, in Statsutvikling i Skandinavia i middelalderen, eds. Sverre Bagge, Michael H. Gelting, Frode Hervik, Thomas Lindkvist & Bjørn Poulsen (Oslo 2012), 101–18.
- Jón R. Hjálmarsson (2009). History of Iceland: From the Settlement to the Present Day. Reykjavik: Forlagið Publishing. ISBN 978-9979-53-513-3.
- Sigurður Gylfi Magnússon. Wasteland with Words. A Social History of Iceland (London: Reaktion Books, 2010)
- Miller, William Ian; "University of Michigan Law School Faculty & Staff". Cgi2.www.law.umich.edu. 24 October 1996. Archived from the original on 2 February 2009. Bloodtaking and Peacemaking: Feud, Law, and Society in Saga Iceland. University of Chicago Press (1997) ISBN 0-226-52680-1
