= 2022 in Iceland =

- Decades: 2000s; 2010s; 2020s
- See also: Other events of 2022; Timeline of Icelandic history

Events in the year 2022 in Iceland.

== Incumbents ==
- President: Guðni Th. Jóhannesson
- Prime Minister: Katrín Jakobsdóttir
- Althing: 2021-present Althing
- Speaker of the Althing: Birgir Ármannsson
- President of the Supreme Court: Karl Axelsson

== Events ==
- Ongoing — COVID-19 pandemic in Iceland
- 4 February – Iceland announces it will end the practice of whaling by 2024, citing the decreasing price of whale meat.
- 4 April – Icelandic journalists along with others from the European Union, Norway, Switzerland, and Liechtenstein from obtaining a visa in Russia by a simplified procedure.
- 17 June – Iceland report their first case of Monkeypox.
- 21 September – Police arrest four people over a terrorist plot, the first of its kind in Iceland's history.

== Deaths ==
- 11 January– Arna Schram, journalist (b. 1968)
- 21 January - Axel Nikulásson, basketball player (b. 1962)
- 4 February - Dóra Ólafsdóttir, centenarian (b. 1912)
- 23 March - Guðrún Helgadóttir, children's author and politician (b. 1935)
- 5 April - Bjarni Tryggvason, astronaut (b. 1945)
- 7 April - Elias Davidsson, composer (b. 1941)
- 1 July - Árni Gunnarsson, journalist and politician (b. 1940)
- 17 August - Ingvar Gíslason, politician (b. 1926)
- 17 September - Hrafn Jökulsson, writer and journalist (b. 1965)
