= 2027 in Iceland =

- Decades: 2000s; 2010s; 2020s
- See also: Other events of 2027; Timeline of Icelandic history

Events in the year 2027 in Iceland.

== Incumbents ==
- President: Halla Tómasdóttir
- Prime Minister: Kristrún Frostadóttir
- Althing: 2024-present Althing
- Speaker of the Althing: Birgir Ármannsson
- President of the Supreme Court: Karl Axelsson

== Events ==
=== Predicted or scheduled ===
- Solar eclipse of August 2, 2027 (partial eclipse)

== Holidays ==
- 1 January – New Year's Day
- 2 April – Maundy Thursday
- 3 April – Good Friday
- 5 April – Easter Sunday
- 6 April – Easter Monday
- 23 April – First day of summer
- 1 May – May Day
- 14 May – Ascension Day
- 24 May – Whit Sunday
- 25 May – Whit Monday
- 17 June – National Day
- 3 August – Commerce Day
- 24 December – Christmas Eve
- 25 December – Christmas Day
- 26 December – Boxing Day
- 31 December – New Year's Eve
