= 2026 in Iceland =

- Decades: 2000s; 2010s; 2020s
- See also: Other events of 2026; Timeline of Icelandic history

Events in the year 2026 in Iceland.

== Incumbents ==
- President: Halla Tómasdóttir
- Prime Minister: Kristrún Frostadóttir
- Althing: 2024-present Althing
- Speaker of the Althing: Birgir Ármannsson
- President of the Supreme Court: Karl Axelsson

== Events ==
- 10 February – Europol announces it dismantled a drug trafficking network that was smuggling cocaine into Iceland and arrested 24 people.
- 12 March – Iceland and the Netherlands announce they will both intervene on the side of South Africa in the International Court of Justice's genocide case against Israel.
- 16 May – 2026 Icelandic municipal elections
- 12 August – A total solar eclipse occurs at the Moon's descending node of the orbit in North America and Europe. The total eclipse passes over the Arctic, Greenland, Iceland, the Atlantic Ocean, northeastern Portugal and northern Spain.
- 29 August – 2026 Icelandic European Union membership negotiations referendum: A motion to restart accession negotiations with the EU is rejected by 52.8% of voters.
- 8 September — Iceland sanctions products from Israeli settlements in the West Bank. (Note: However, Iceland clarified that settlement trade restrictions are contingent on EU action.)

== Holidays ==
- 1 January – New Year's Day
- 2 April – Maundy Thursday
- 3 April – Good Friday
- 5 April – Easter Sunday
- 6 April – Easter Monday
- 23 April – First day of summer
- 1 May – May Day
- 14 May – Ascension Day
- 24 May – Whit Sunday
- 25 May – Whit Monday
- 17 June – National Day
- 3 August – Commerce Day
- 24 December – Christmas Eve
- 25 December – Christmas Day
- 26 December – Boxing Day
- 31 December – New Year's Eve

== Art and entertainment ==
- List of Icelandic submissions for the Academy Award for Best International Feature Film

== Deaths ==
- 10 January – Sturla Böðvarsson, 80, minister of communications and transportation (1999–2007), president of the Althing (2007–2009)
- 23 January – Kristinn Svavarsson, 78, saxophonist (Mezzoforte). (death announced on this date)
- 1 March – Davíð Oddsson, 78, prime minister (1991–2004).
- 13 March – Hjálmar H. Ragnarsson, 73, composer. (death announced on this date)
- 9 April – Björgvin Halldórsson, 74, musician.
- 17 June – Margrét Helga Jóhannsdóttir, 86, actress.
- 7 July – Megas, 81, musician.
- 30 July – Gunnar Þórðarson, 81, musician. (death announced on this date)
- 10 November – Mörður Árnason, 73, politician.
