= 2024 in Iceland =

- Decades: 2000s; 2010s; 2020s
- See also: Other events of 2024; Timeline of Icelandic history

Events in the year 2024 in Iceland.

== Incumbents ==
- President: Guðni Th. Jóhannesson (until 1 August); Halla Tómasdóttir (since 1 August)
- Prime Minister: Katrín Jakobsdóttir (until 9 April); Bjarni Benediktsson (until 21 December); Kristrún Frostadóttir (since 21 December)
- Althing: 2021-present Althing
- Speaker of the Althing: Birgir Ármannsson
- President of the Supreme Court: Karl Axelsson

== Events ==
=== January ===
- 1 January – President Guðni Th. Jóhannesson announces that he would not be seeking a third term.
- 14 January – 2023–2025 Sundhnúkur eruptions: The Reykjanes volcanic system erupts near the town of Grindavík, with one fissure forming inside the town limits.

=== March ===
- 16 March – A state of emergency is issued in southwestern Iceland after the Reykjanes volcanic system erupts again.

=== April ===
- 5 April – Katrin Jakobsdottir resigns as prime minister in order to run in presidential elections on 1 June.

=== May ===
- 29 May – Grindavik and the Blue Lagoon are evacuated following a resurgence in activity by the Reykjanes volcanic system.

=== June ===
- 1 June – 2024 Icelandic presidential election: Halla Tómasdóttir is elected with 32.1% of the vote.

=== August ===
- 1 August – Halla Tómasdóttir is inaugurated as President of Iceland.
- 22 August – 2023–2025 Sundhnúkur eruptions: An eruption is recorded from a new fissure in the Reykjanes volcanic system.
- 25 August – A foreign tourist is killed and two others are reported missing after an ice cave collapses at the Breiðamerkurjökull glacier.

=== September ===
- 1 September – Guðrún Karls Helgudóttir became the fifteenth Bishop of Iceland, succeeding Agnes Sigurðardóttir.
- 19 September – A polar bear is shot dead by police in Westfjords after being deemed a threat to residents. The incident marks the first such sighting of the animal in the country since 2016.

=== October ===
- 13 October – The coalition government led by Prime Minister Bjarni Benediktsson collapses, prompting him to call for new elections.

=== November ===
- 20 November – 2023–2025 Sundhnúkur eruptions: An eruption is recorded from a new fissure in the Reykjanes volcanic system.
- 30 November – 2024 Icelandic parliamentary election: The Social Democratic Alliance outperforms the ruling Independence Party to win a plurality of seats in the Althing.

=== December ===
- 5 December – The government issues new five-year licences to hunt for whales for the first time since 2023.
- 21 December – Kristrún Frostadóttir is sworn in as prime minister.

== Holidays ==
- 1 January - New Year's Day
- 28 March - Maundy Thursday
- 29 March - Good Friday
- 31 March - Easter Sunday
- 1 April - Easter Monday
- 25 April - First day of summer
- 1 May - May Day
- 9 May - Ascension Day
- 19 May - Whit Sunday
- 20 May - Whit Monday
- 17 June - National Day
- 5 August - Commerce Day
- 24 December - Christmas Eve
- 25 December - Christmas Day
- 26 December – Boxing Day
- 31 December – New Year's Eve

== Art and entertainment ==
- List of Icelandic submissions for the Academy Award for Best International Feature Film

== Deaths ==
- 1 February: Ásmundur Bjarnason, 96, Olympic sprinter (1948, 1952).
- 12 February: Karl Sigurbjörnsson, 77, Evangelical Lutheran prelate, bishop of Iceland, served in office in 1998–2012 (b. 1947).
- 6 March: Hreinn Friðfinnsson, 81, artist.
