= 2025 in Iceland =

- Decades: 2000s; 2010s; 2020s
- See also: Other events of 2025; Timeline of Icelandic history

Events in the year 2025 in Iceland.

== Incumbents ==
- President: Halla Tómasdóttir
- Prime Minister: Kristrún Frostadóttir
- Althing: 2024-present Althing
- Speaker of the Althing: Birgir Ármannsson
- President of the Supreme Court: Karl Axelsson

== Events ==
- 20 March – Ásthildur Lóa Þórsdóttir resigns as minister for children after admitting that she had given birth to a child in 1989 following a relationship with a 15-year old boy when she was a 22-year old counsellor at a religious group.
- 1 April – 2023–2025 Sundhnúkur eruptions: The Sundhnúksgígar crater erupts again, prompting the evacuation of nearby Grindavík and the Blue Lagoon.
- 16 July – 2023–2025 Sundhnúkur eruptions: The Sundhnúksgígar crater erupts again, prompting the evacuation of nearby Grindavík and the Blue Lagoon.
- 16 September – Iceland signs a free trade agreement with the Mercosur bloc.
- 27 September – Snæfellsnes National Park is designated as a biosphere reserve by UNESCO.
- 16 October – The first mosquitoes in Iceland are discovered in Kiðafell, Kjós.
- 10 December – Iceland declares a boycott of Eurovision 2026 in response to the European Broadcasting Union's decision to allow Israel to participate in the contest.

=== Scheduled ===
- 2024–25 Úrvalsdeild kvenna (basketball)

== Holidays ==
- 1 January – New Year's Day
- 28 March – Maundy Thursday
- 29 March – Good Friday
- 31 March – Easter Sunday
- 1 April – Easter Monday
- 25 April – First day of summer
- 1 May – May Day
- 9 May – Ascension Day
- 19 May – Whit Sunday
- 20 May – Whit Monday
- 17 June – National Day
- 5 August – Commerce Day
- 24 December – Christmas Eve
- 25 December – Christmas Day
- 26 December – Boxing Day
- 31 December – New Year's Eve

== Art and entertainment ==
- List of Icelandic submissions for the Academy Award for Best International Feature Film

== Deaths ==
- 3 January – Futuregrapher, 41, musician.
- 24 January – Ellert Schram, 85, footballer and politician.
- 2 February – Björgólfur Guðmundsson, 84.
- 4 April – Friðrik Ólafsson, 90, chess grandmaster.
- 12 April – Steindór Andersen, 70, musician.
- 30 June – Magnús Þór Hafsteinsson, 61, politician.
- 20 December – Katina, c.50, Icelandic captive orca (SeaWorld Orlando).
