= 2023 in Iceland =

- Decades: 2000s; 2010s; 2020s
- See also: Other events of 2023; Timeline of Icelandic history

Events in the year 2023 in Iceland.

== Incumbents ==
- President: Guðni Th. Jóhannesson
- Prime Minister: Katrín Jakobsdóttir
- Althing: 2021-present Althing
- Speaker of the Althing: Birgir Ármannsson
- President of the Supreme Court: Karl Axelsson

== Events ==
- 16-17 May – The 4th Council of Europe Summit is held in Reykjavík, focusing on Ukraine, human rights, democracy, and the rule of law.
- 9 June – Iceland announces that it will suspend operations at its embassy in Moscow, Russia, from 1 August, saying that "commercial, cultural and political relations" with Russia are "at an all-time low" and that maintaining the embassy is "no longer justifiable"
- 21 June – Fisheries and Agriculture Minister Svandís Svavarsdóttir announces that all whaling operations will be suspended in the country until August 31 at the earliest, citing welfare concerns after a video emerged of a hunted whale dying in agony over a five-hour period.
- 5 July –
  - The Icelandic Meteorological Office issues a volcano warning after detecting around 2,200 earthquakes around Reykjavík, indicating a potential imminent eruption at Fagradalsfjall. An aviation safety alert has also been issued.
  - Iceland provides roughly 50 million ISK worth of basic EOD equipment to Ukrainian explosive ordnance disposal (EOD) teams as part of a Nordic-led training programme in Lithuania to help detect and destroy unexploded bombs in Ukraine.
- 1 August – Iceland and Lithuania sign a Memorandum of Understanding allowing Icelandic diplomats to use facilities at the Lithuanian Embassy in Kyiv.
- 24 October – Women across Iceland, including Prime Minister Katrín Jakobsdóttir, participate in a nationwide strike (“kvennaverkfall”) against gender-based violence and unequal pay.
- 10 November – 2023 Iceland earthquakes: Iceland declares a state of emergency after a series of earthquakes occurs near the Fagradalsfjall volcano on the Southern Peninsula. The Icelandic Meteorological Office says that an eruption could occur in the coming days.
- 18 December – 2023 Iceland earthquakes: A volcanic eruption occurs on the Reykjanes Peninsula after weeks of earthquakes prompting the evacuation of 4,000 people. The Icelandic Meteorological Office says that the risk of lava flowing toward the town of Grindavík is high.

== Deaths ==
- 9 May – Anna Kolbrún Árnadóttir, politician (b. 1970)
- 6 June – Árni Johnsen, journalist and politician, member of the Althing (1983–1987, 1991–2001, 2007–2013) (b. 1944)
- 30 June – Eva Maria Daniels, film producer (b. 1979)

== Sports ==
- 2022–23 Úrvalsdeild karla (basketball)
- 2022–23 Úrvalsdeild kvenna (basketball)
- UEFA Euro 2024 qualifying Group J
