= 2021 in Iceland =

- Decades: 2000s; 2010s; 2020s
- See also: Other events of 2021; Timeline of Icelandic history

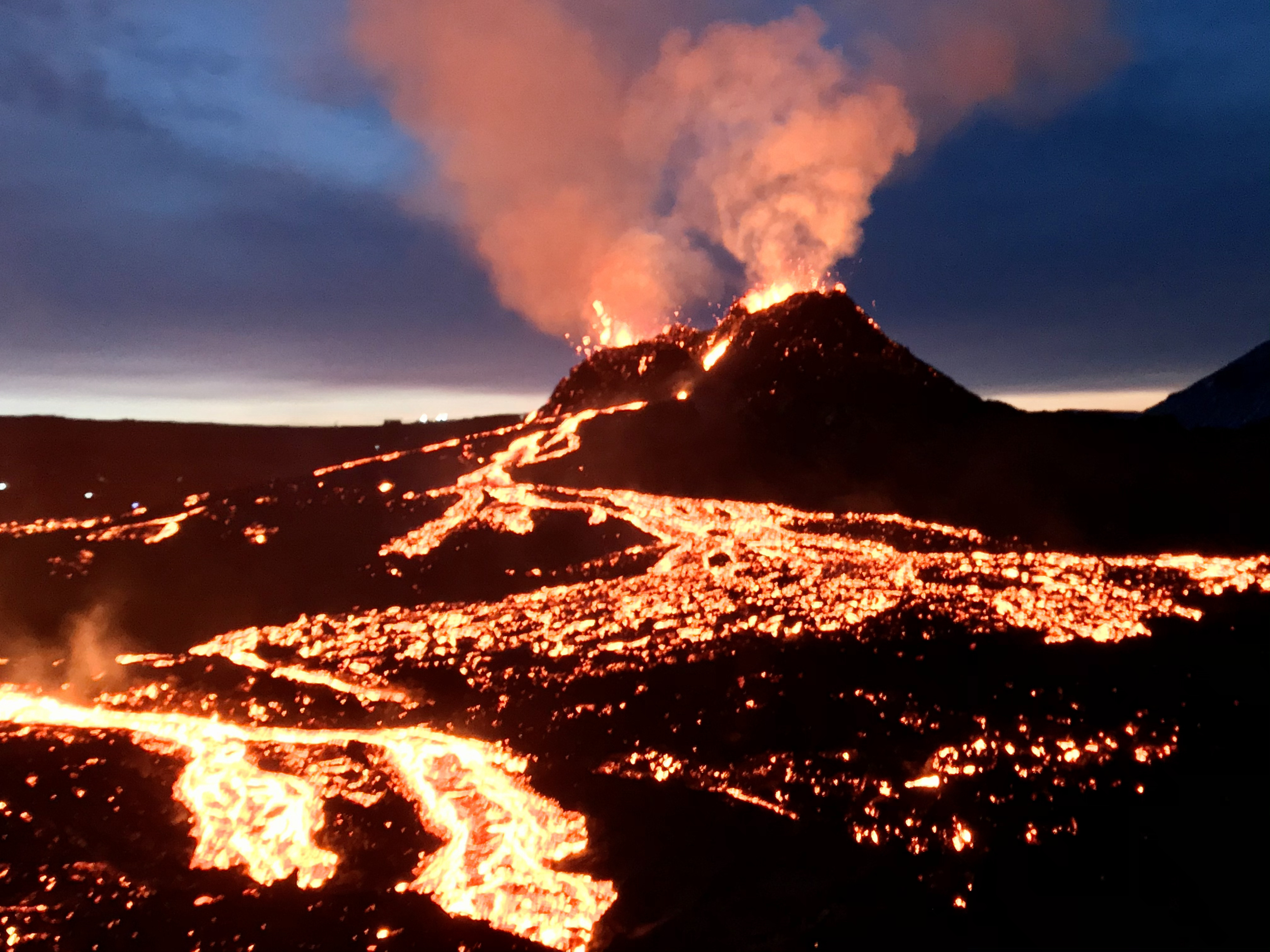
Geldingadalsgos volcano eruption with two craters, March 27, 2021.

Events in the year 2021 in Iceland.

== Incumbents ==
- President: Guðni Th. Jóhannesson
- Prime Minister: Katrín Jakobsdóttir
- Althing: 2017-present Althing
- Speaker of the Althing: Steingrímur J. Sigfússon
- President of the Supreme Court: Karl Axelsson

== Events ==
- Ongoing — COVID-19 pandemic in Iceland
- 20 August – Netflix Iceland releases The Loud House Movie.
- 25 September – The parliamentary election for the Althing.

== Deaths ==
- 1 January - Ágúst Herbert Guðmundsson, basketball player (b. 1967)
- 18 January – Svavar Gestsson, politician (b. 1944)
- 24 January - Jóhannes Eðvaldsson, (b. 1950)
- 14 June - Gunnar Birgisson, (b. 1947)
- 9 July - Þórunn Egilsdóttir, (b. 1964)
- 10 September - Jón Sigurðsson, (b. 1946)
- 16 September - Vilborg Dagbjartsdóttir, (b. 1930)
- 11 December - Fjölnir Geir Bragason, tattoo artist (b.1965)
- 14 December - María Guðmundsdóttir, (b. 1935)
- 22 December - Egill Skúli Ingibergsson, (b. 1926)
