= Bragason =

Bragason is a surname. Notable people with the surname include:

- Bo Bragason (born 2004), English actress
- Fjölnir Geir Bragason (1965–2021), Icelandic tattoo artist
- Ragnar Bragason (born 1971), Icelandic film director, screenwriter, and producer
- Sigurður Bragason (born 1954), Icelandic baritone
