= Sigrún Pálsdóttir =

Icelandic writer and historian

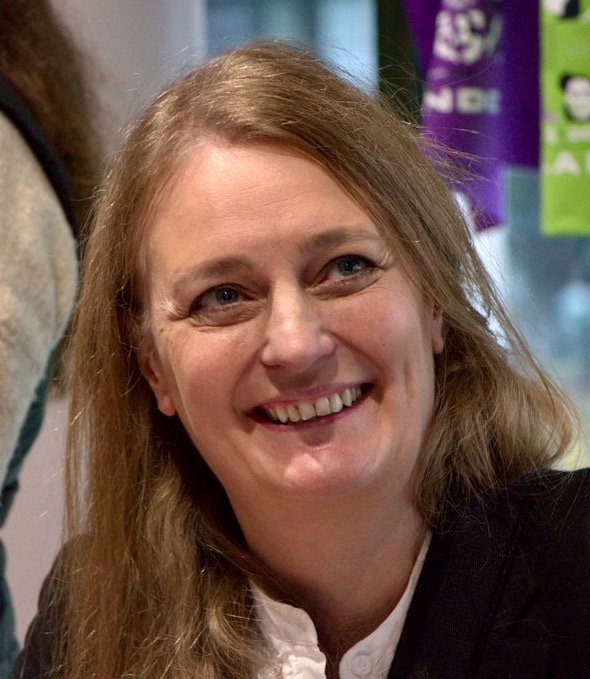

Sigrún Pálsdóttir is an Icelandic writer and historian. She was born in Reykjavík in 1967. She obtained her doctorate from Oxford University in 2001, and then taught and researched at the University of Iceland. A prominent Icelandic historian, she served as the editor of Saga, the premier scholarly journal of the discipline, from 2009 to 2016. Her books have been nominated for The Icelandic Literary Prize, Icelandic Women’s Literature Prize, The Hagþenkir Non-fiction Prize and The DV Culture Prize. Her book Uncertain Seas was chosen the best biography in 2013 by booksellers in Iceland. Palsdottir’s novel, Embroidery, is the Icelandic winner of the European Union Prize for Literature 2021. Palsdottir received the Icelandic Literary Prize 2025 for The Blue Panther.

== Works ==
=== Non-fiction ===
- Þóra biskups og raunir íslenskrar embættismannastéttar (Thora. A Bishop’s Daughter) 2010.
- Ferðasaga (Uncertain Seas) 2013.

=== Novels ===
- Kompa (2016). In English: History. A Mess (Open Letter 2019 (US) and Peirene Press (UK) 2022). In Estonian: Salakamber (Kirjastus Salv 2024).
- Delluferðin (2019). In English: Embroidery (Open Letter 2022). Also translated into French, Italian, Croatian, Hungarian, Czech, Serbian, Lithuanian, Greek, Armenian, Arabic and Macedonian.
- Dyngja (2021). In English: Boudoir (Peirene Press and Open Letter 2026). Also translated into Hungarian.
- MEN. Vorkvöld í Reykjavík (A Spring Night in Reykjavík) 2023.
- Blái pardusinn. Hljóðbók (The Blue Panther) 2025.

=== External links ===
https://reykjavikliteraryagency.is/hofundar/sigrun-palsdottir/
