= 2020 in Iceland =

- Decades: 2000s; 2010s; 2020s
- See also: Other events of 2020; Timeline of Icelandic history

Events in the year 2020 in Iceland.

== Incumbents ==
- President: Guðni Th. Jóhannesson
- Prime Minister: Katrín Jakobsdóttir

== Events ==
- 9 February – Hildur Guðnadóttir became the first Icelander to win an Academy Award.
- 28 February – The first case of COVID-19 in the country was confirmed.
- 13 March – A ban on public gatherings in response to COVID-19 was announced.
- 17 March – The first death from COVID-19 on the island was confirmed; the patient was an Australian tourist.
- 27 May – End of voting in the 2020 Icelandic presidential election.

=== Predicted and scheduled events ===
- 12 December – 33rd European Film Awards.
- Estimated completion of the Dýrafjarðargöng.
