= 2017 in Iceland =

- Decades: 1990s; 2000s; 2010s; 2020s
- See also: Other events of 2017; Timeline of Icelandic history

Events in the year 2017 in Iceland.

== Incumbents ==
- President: Guðni Th. Jóhannesson
- Prime Minister: Sigurður Ingi Jóhannsson (until 11 January); Bjarni Benediktsson (11 January to 30 November); Katrín Jakobsdóttir (Starting 30 November)

== Events ==
- 11 January – Bjarni Benediktsson takes over as prime minister.
- 15 September - Protests in Iceland occur over a scandal involving an undisclosed letter sent by Prime Minister Bjarni Benediktsson to pardon a criminal. Amid backlash, he calls for snap elections to be held on 28 October.
- 28 October - Snap elections are held just one year after the previous ones.
- 30 November - After a month of trying to form coalitions between parties, Katrín Jakobsdóttir becomes the Prime Minister of Iceland.

== Deaths ==
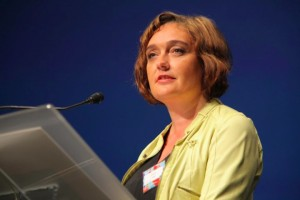
Ólöf Nordal

- 30 January – Eiður Svanberg Guðnason, politician (b. 1939).
- 8 February – Ólöf Nordal, Icelandic politician, Minister of the Interior 2014–2017 (b. 1966; cancer)
- 27 February – Jórunn Viðar, pianist and composer (b. 1918).
- 1 July – Orri Vigfússon, entrepreneur and environmentalist (b. 1942)
