= 2018 in Iceland =

- Decades: 1990s; 2000s; 2010s; 2020s
- See also: Other events of 2018; Timeline of Icelandic history

Events in the year 2018 in Iceland.

== Incumbents ==
- President: Guðni Th. Jóhannesson
- Prime Minister: Katrín Jakobsdóttir

== Events ==
- 26 May – scheduled date for the Icelandic municipal elections, 2018

=== Sports ===
- 9 to 25 February – Iceland participated at the 2018 Winter Olympics in PyeongChang, South Korea, with 5 competitors in 2 sports
- 9 to 18 March – Iceland participated at the 2018 Winter Paralympics in PyeongChang, South Korea

== Deaths ==
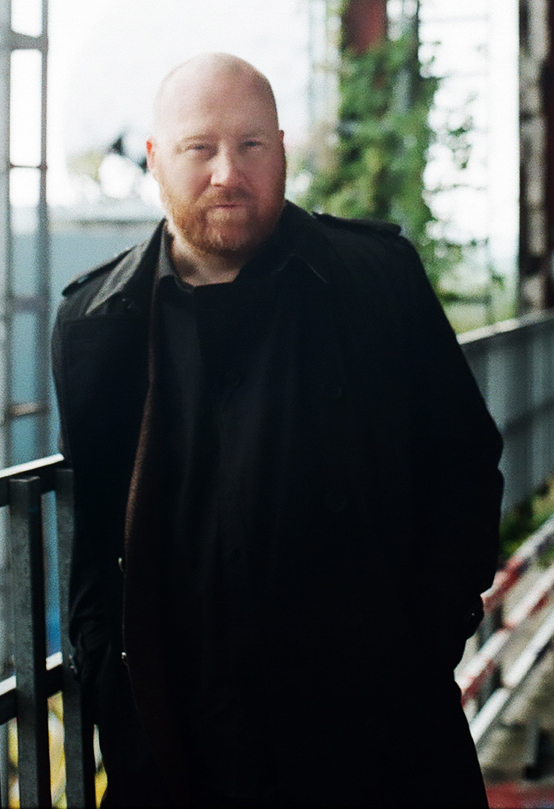
Jóhann Jóhannsson

- 9 February – Jóhann Jóhannsson, composer (b. 1969)
- 28 February – Stefán Kristjánsson, chess player (b. 1982).
- 12 March – Sverrir Hermannsson, politician, businessman and banker (b. 1930)
- 16 March – Guðjón Arnar Kristjánsson, politician, MP (b. 1944).
- 24 May – Oddur Pétursson, cross country skier (b. 1931).
- 29 June – Jónas Kristjánsson, writer and newspaper editor (b. 1940).
- 21 August – Stefán Karl Stefánsson, actor and singer (b. 1975).
