= First day of summer =

First day of summer may refer to:

- The beginning of the summer half of the year in the early Germanic calendars
- The beginning of the summer half of the year in medieval and modern Scandinavian culture, observed in April
  - First day of summer (Iceland), a public holiday in Iceland
- Start of the meteorological summer, June 1 in the Northern Hemisphere
