= Huldufólk =

Elves in Icelandic and Faroese folklore

Hidden-folk
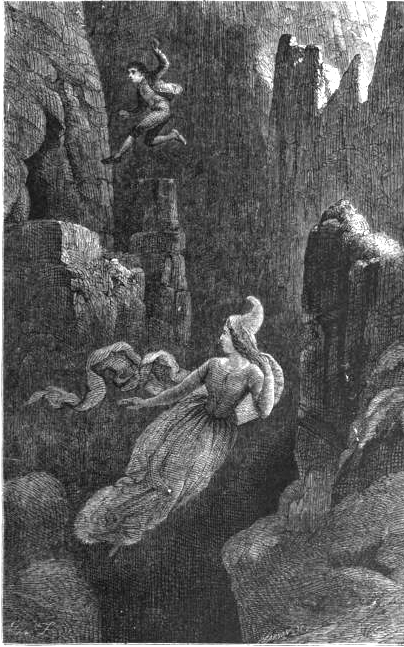
- Engraving of a man jumping after a female elf into a precipice.

Creature information
- Grouping: Mythological
- Similar entities: Elf, hulder, fairy, mermaid, pixie, sprite, leprechaun

Origin
- Country: Iceland, Faroe Islands, Denmark, Sweden, Norway
- Habitat: Various

In Nordic folklore, including the Northern Isles, hidden-folk (Faroese and Icelandic: huldufólk; Norwegian: huldrefolk), mound-folk (Danish: højfolk, Swedish: högfolk), (Note: cf. Old Norse: haugbúi; Norwegian: haugbonde; Orcadian: hogboon, hogboy; Lincolnshire: shag-boy; Shetlandic: hjogfinni) mountain-folk (Danish: bjærgfolk, Swedish: bergfolk, bergafolk; Finnish: vuoren väki), subterraneans (Norwegian: underjordiske, Swedish: underjordiska; Gutnish: di sma undar jordi, "the small underground"; Finnish: maahiset, roughly "grounders"), among other names (Swedish: oknytt, Insular Scots: trow, drow), are collective names for a loose race or conglomeration of elves, wights, brownies (Nordic: nisse), trolls, and thereof. They are supernatural beings that live in nature. They look and behave similarly to humans, but live in a parallel world. They can make themselves visible at will. Konrad von Maurer cites a 19th-century Icelandic source claiming that the only visible difference between normal people and outwardly human-appearing huldufólk is, the latter have a convex rather than concave philtrum (Icelandic: vuldulág) below their noses. An analog myth are the trolls being discerned by their large noses.

In Faroese folk tales, hidden people are said to be "large in build, their clothes are all grey, and their hair black (the same description is also given for draugrs in Faroese folklore). Their dwellings are in mounds, and they are also called Elves." Some Icelandic folk tales caution against throwing stones, as it may hit the hidden people.

The term huldufólk was taken as a synonym of álfar (elves) in 19th-century Icelandic folklore. Jón Árnason found that the terms are synonymous, except álfar is a pejorative term. Konrad von Maurer contends that huldufólk originates as a euphemism to avoid calling the álfar by their real name.

There is, however, some evidence that the two terms have come to be taken as referring to two distinct sets of supernatural beings in contemporary Iceland. Katrin Sontag found that some people do not differentiate elves from hidden people, while others do. A 2006 survey found that "54% of respondents did not distinguish between elves and hidden people, 20% did and 26% said they were not sure."

== Etymology ==
There are countless names for the phenomenon around the Nordics and beyond, most of which are purely descriptive at their core. A modern example can be found in the children's book character Plupp, by Swedish author Inga Borg, who according to the author is an "invisibling" (osynling, lit. 'unseenling').

=== Hidden folk ===
Icelandic and Faroese Huldufólk, as well as Norwegian: huldrefolk, means "hidden-folk", compounding huldu/huldre- ("pertaining to secrecy"), and fólk ("people, folk"). The fore element stems from Old Norse: huldr, past participle of hylja ("to hide, cover"). Beings within huldufólk may be called "hulder" m., or "huldra" f., etc.

Related terms includes hulder, a related entity, and in Old Norse poetry, related forms can also be found in huldarhǫttr (Danish: hyllehat, Norwegian: hulderhatt) and huliðshjalmr, "hat-" and "helmet of invisibility" respectively. In Huldar saga, Huldr is the name of a witch.

=== Finnic names ===
In Finnish, hidden folk are called maahinen (plural: maahiset), compounding Finnish: maa ("ground, land"), with the suffix -hinen, which forms nouns or adjectives of belonging to or possessing a particular quality. If a maahinen is in a forest, it could be called metsähinen instead, and if in water, vetehinen. The Tornedalian form is maahiainen.

Many terms are based around the term väki, such as hiidenväki ("underworld folk, graveyard folk"), maan väki ("ground folk"), maanalusväki ("underground folk"), manhon väki ("world folk"?), metsän väki ("folk of the forrest"), vuoren väki ("folk of the mountain"), and veden väki ("folk of the water). In Northern Finland, the terms vanha väki ("old folk") and vanhaset ("the old ones") have been used, and for Forest Finns, the term moanpitävät ("keepers of the land").

Some terms also compound hiisi, such as metsähiisi ("forrest being") and vesihiisi ("water being"), or simply the word hiisi can refer to maahiset as well.

== Origins ==
Terry Gunnell writes: "different beliefs could have lived side by side in multicultural settlement Iceland before they gradually blended into the latter-day Icelandic álfar and huldufólk." He also writes: "Huldufólk and álfar undoubtedly arose from the same need. The Norse settlers had the álfar, the Irish slaves had the hill fairies or the Good People. Over time, they became two different beings, but really they are two different sets of folklore that mean the same thing."

Precursors to elves/hidden people can be found in the writings of Snorri Sturluson and in skaldic verse. Elves were also mentioned in Poetic Edda, and appear to be connected to fertility.

The Christianization of Iceland in the 11th century brought with it new religious concepts. According to one Christian folk tale, the origins of the hidden people can be traced to Adam and Eve. Eve hid her dirty, unwashed children from God, and lied about their existence. God then declared: "What man hides from God, God will hide from man." Other Christian folktales claim that hidden people originate from Lilith, or are fallen angels condemned to live between heaven and hell.

In succession of Christianization, official opposition to dancing may have begun in Iceland as early as the 12th century, and the association of dancing with elves can be seen as early as the 15th century. One folktale shows the elves siding with the common people and taking revenge on a sheriff who banned dance parties. Aðalheiður Guðmundsdóttir concludes that these legends "show that Icelanders missed dancing".

In the 13th and 14th centuries, books from mainland Europe reached Iceland, and may have influenced folktales about elves.

Einar Ólafur Sveinsson writes: "Round about 1600 sources for hidden folk become so voluminous that we can readily define the beliefs and legends about them, and after that there is one source after another about them right down into the twentieth century." According to Árni Björnsson, belief in hidden people grew during the 17th and 18th centuries when Iceland was facing tough times.

According to Davide Finco Genoa, elves have existed in religious context as far back as the Stone age. He uses Swedish elf offering cups, known as "alvkvarnar," as an example.

== Holidays ==
There are four Icelandic holidays considered to have a special connection with hidden people: New Year's Eve, Thirteenth Night (January 6), Midsummer Night and Christmas night. Elf bonfires (álfabrennur) are a common part of the holiday festivities on Twelfth Night (January 6). There are many Icelandic folktales about elves and hidden people invading Icelandic farmhouses during Christmas and holding wild parties. It is customary in Iceland to clean the house before Christmas, and to leave food for the huldufólk on Christmas. On New Year's Eve, it is believed that the elves move to new locations, and Icelanders leave candles to help them find their way. On Midsummer Night, folklore states that if you sit at a crossroads, elves will attempt to seduce you with food and gifts; there are grave consequences for being seduced by their offers, but great rewards for resisting.

== Icelandic and Faroese folklore ==
Several scholars have commented on the connections between hidden people and the Icelandic natural environment. B.S. Benedikz, in his discussion of Jón Árnason's grouping of folktales about elves, water-dwellers, and trolls together, writes:

"The reason is of course perfectly clear. When one's life is conditioned by a landscape dominated by rocks twisted by volcanic action, wind and water into ferocious and alarming shapes ... the imagination fastens on these natural phenomena."

Ólina Thorvarðardóttir writes:

"Oral tales concerning Icelandic elves and trolls no doubt served as warning fables. They prevented many children from wandering away from human habitations, taught Iceland's topographical history, and instilled fear and respect for the harsh powers of nature."

Michael Strmiska writes:

"The Huldufólk are ... not so much supernatural as ultranatural, representing not an overcoming of nature in the hope of a better deal beyond but a deep reverence for the land and the mysterious powers able to cause fertility or famine."

Pálsdóttir claims that in a landscape filled with earthquakes, avalanches, and volcanoes,

"it is no wonder that the native people have assigned some secret life to the landscape. There had to be some unseen powers behind such unpredictability, such cruelty."

Alan Boucher writes:

"Thus the Icelander's ambivalent attitude towards nature, the enemy and the provider, is clearly expressed in these stories, which preserve a good deal of popular – and in some cases probably pre-christian – belief."

Robert Anderson writes that syncretism

"is active in Iceland where Christianity, spiritism, and Icelandic elf lore have syncretized in at least a couple instances."

Terry Gunnell notes that hidden people legends recorded in the 18th and 19th centuries showed them to be

"near mirror-images of those humans who told stories about them – except they were beautiful, powerful, alluring, and free from care, while the Icelanders were often starving and struggling for existence. The huldufólk seem in many ways to represent the Icelander's dreams of a more perfect and happy existence."

Anthropologist Jón Haukur Ingimundarson claimed that hidden people tales told by 19th century Icelandic women were a reflection of how only 47% of women were married, and

"sisters often found themselves relegated to very different functions and levels of status in society ... the vast majority of Icelandic girls were shunted into supporting roles in the household."

He goes on to say that these stories justified the differences in role and status between sisters, and

"inculcated in young girls the ... stoic adage never to despair, which was a psychological preparedness many would need as they found themselves reduced in status and denied the proper outlet for their sexuality in marriage, thereby sometimes having to rely on infanticide to take care of the unsolicited and insupportable effects of their occasional amours, an element ... related in huldufólk stories."

Anna Pietrzkiewicz contends that the hidden people symbolize idealized Icelandic identity and society, the key elements of which are seeing the "past as a source of pride and nature as unique and pure."

Hidden people often appear in the dreams of Icelanders. They are usually described as wearing 19th century Icelandic clothing, and are often described as wearing green.

In one version of modern Faroese folklore, the hidden people vanished in the 1950s when electricity was brought to the island.

"The Elf Maiden" is a Norse folklore about a young man who marries an elf woman. As their marriage progresses, the elf maiden begins to periodically, miraculously disappear from his sight. The elf maiden finally tells her husband that she will eventually disappear, permanently, and that the only way to prevent it is by hammering a nail into a threshold

According to Scandinavian Author Ármann Jakobsson,

"In the Eyrbyggja saga", we find the familiar idea that people are expected to relieve themselves at a safe distance from a sacred spot, and the word used (dlfrek) indicates that the alfar be expected to get angry."

In her book, Icelandic Folktales and Legends, Jacqueline Simpson provides two origins stories for the Huldufolk:

- The first story says the Huldufolk are some of the children of Adam and Eve. These children were not washed and therefore Eve avoided presenting them to God. In return, God said; "That which had to be hidden from Me, shall also be hidden from man," thus creating the "hidden people" / huldufolk / elves, out of the children and their offspring.
- The second folktale describing the origin of Huldufolk says that when the devil raised a revolt in heaven, the inhabitants who did not side with him, but also were not against him, were sent down to Earth. They would live in, "knowles, hills, and rocks" and "cannot live with other people." These people are the Huldifolk or Elves.

== Contemporary Iceland ==
A survey of Icelanders born between 1870 and 1920 found that people did not generally believe in hidden people and that when they had learned about supernatural beings in their youth, those lessons had mostly been made for amusement. About 10% seemed to actually believe in hidden people. A survey from 1974 showed that among those born between 1904 and 1944, 7% were certain of the existence of hidden people.

Several modern surveys have been made showing a surprising number of believers. Around 7–8% claim to be certain that elves exist, and around 45% claim it is likely or possible.

These surveys have been criticized as being misrepresentative, as journalists have claimed that they show that a majority of Icelanders believe in elves, despite belief not being that serious. Folklore professor Terry Gunnell has said: "Very few will say immediately that they 'believe' in such, but they won't deny it either." Different ways of asking could elicit very different responses.

Árni Björnsson claims the beliefs are simplified and exaggerated for the entertainment of children and tourists, and that it is a somewhat misrepresentative yet harmless trick used by the tourism industry to entice visitors. The stories of elves may have been fun tales rather than beliefs.

== Tourism ==
The Icelandic Elf School in Reykjavík organizes five-hour-long educational excursions for visitors.

Hafnarfjörður offers a "Hidden Worlds tour", a guided walk of about 90 minutes. It includes a stroll through Hellisgerdi Park, where the paths wind through a lava field planted with tall trees and potted bonsai trees in summer, and said to be peopled with the town's largest elf colony.

Stokkseyri has the Icelandic Wonders museum, where "Museum guests will walk into a world of the Icelandic elves and hidden people and get a glimpse of their life."

Information boards at Dverghamrar state that the local variety of dwarf is 20–30 cm tall.

== Recent incidents ==
During road construction in Kópavogur in 1971, a bulldozer broke down. The driver placed the blame on elves living in a large rock. Despite locals not having been aware of any elves living in the rock, newspapers ran with the story, thus starting the myth that Icelandic road construction was often impeded by elves.

In 1982, 150 Icelanders went to the NATO base in Keflavík to look for "elves who might be endangered by American Phantom jets and AWACS reconnaissance planes." In 2004, Alcoa had to have a government expert certify that their chosen building site was free of archaeological sites, including ones related to huldufólk folklore, before they could build an aluminium smelter in Iceland. In 2011, elves/huldufólk were believed by some to be responsible for an incident in Bolungarvík where rocks rained down on residential streets.

In 2013, proposed road construction from the Álftanes peninsula to the Reykjavík suburb of Garðabær, was stopped because elf supporters and environmental groups protested, stating that the road would destroy the habitat of elves and local cultural beliefs. According to G Pétur Matthíasson, head of communication at the Icelandic Road and Coastal Administration, "[one of the protesters] was interested in this one big rock that was in the line of the road. We then look at it, not through believing in elves, but believing that elves or hidden people are part of our cultural heritage. We looked at this big rock formation and saw that it was unique, and decided that because we could move [the road], we would try to do that.”

In 2013, in Reykjavik, construction on a road was halted because a group of protesters showed up, including people who believed that the construction would "disturb the habitat of elves that live among the rocks."

== Intentions ==
In her book, Icelandic Folktales and Legends, Jacqueline Simpson says that Elves, "can do both good and evil, and both in the highest degree."

In Snorri Sturluson's The Prose Edda, the story of "The Beguiling of Gylfi," Elves are described as being either Dark or Light, both in manner and appearance: "That which is called Alfheimer is one, where dwell the peoples called Light Elves; but the Dark-Elves dwell down in the earth, and they are unlike in appearance, but are far more unlike in nature. The Light-Elves are fairer to look upon than the sun, but the Dark-Elves are blacker than pitch."

Terry Gunnel argues that the Eddic poem, Völundarkviða, presents elves as having a "Dangerous, supernatural 'otherness'" to them.

In a BBC Ideas Youtube Video, Icelandic residents are interviewed on their beliefs on the Huldufolk. Within the video, Storyteller, Sigurbjörg Karlsdóttir argues that "whether you believe it or not, these stories about the elves and these creatures, they teach us to respect nature." Student, Helga Osterby Thordardottir, argues similarly, saying that "Maybe the Huldifolk is giving Nature a voice."

In a Youtube film by Julia Laird titled, "Hidden People," politician and resident of the Icelandic town of Hafnarfjörður, Ragnhildur Jónsdóttir, claims that she can speak to the Huldufolk. Jónsdóttir argues that "Some are farmers, some are fishermen, you know just living their regular life like we do." She also says that the Huldufolk are "Willing to help everyone in need, and it does not matter what color, or where they come from or what faith [...] If someone is in need, they are willing to help."

== Significant sites ==
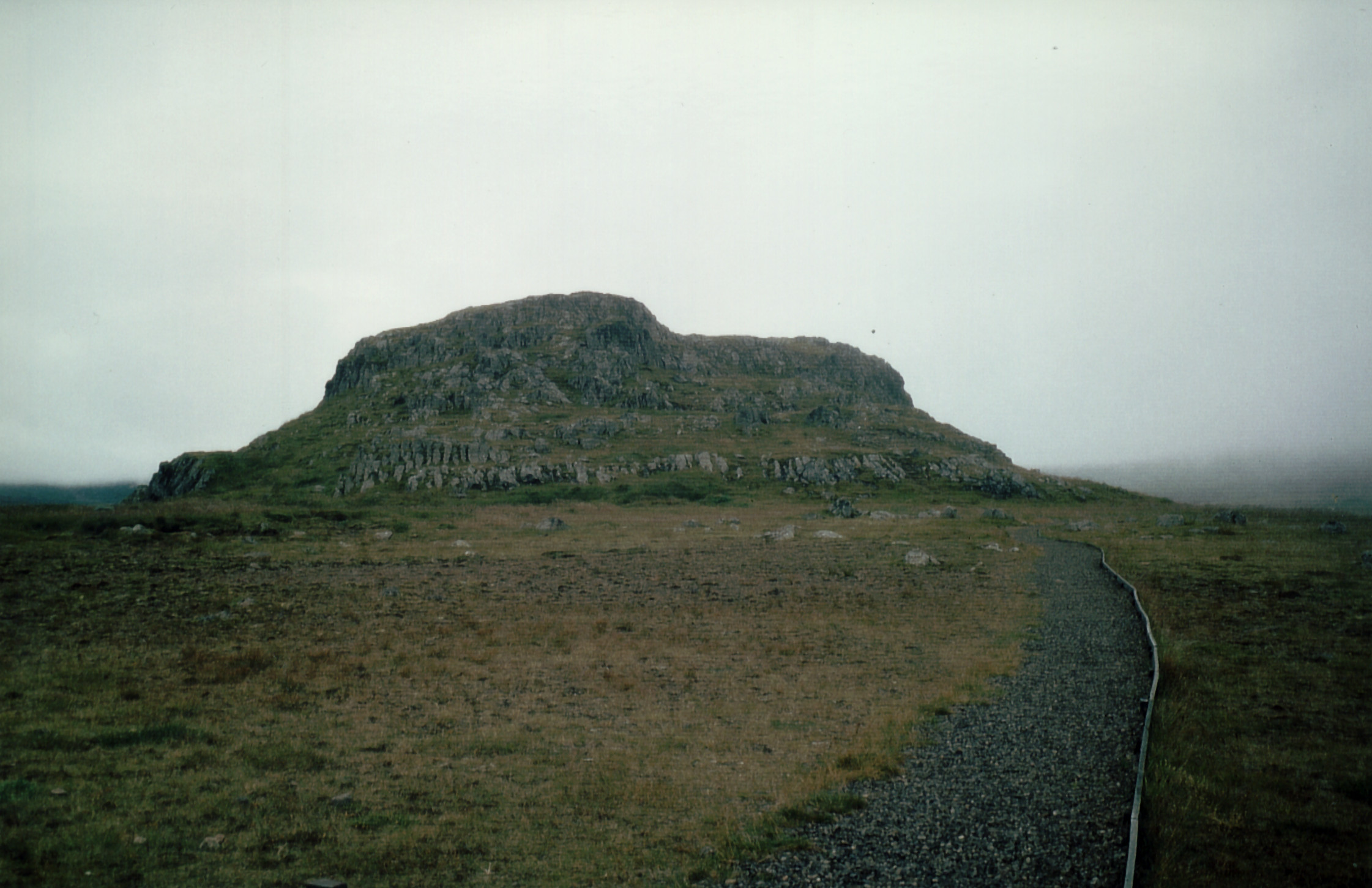
Álfaborg, Iceland

- Hulduhóll (Elfin Hill), a hillock approximately 60 meters west of Kirkjuhóll (64°11′17.52″N 21°38′31.38″W)
- Hafnarfjörður; areas include:
  - Hellisgerði Lava Park (64°4′17″N 21°57′30″W)
  - Hamarinn Cliffs (64°3′57.81″N 21°56′59.06″W)
  - near Sundhöll Hafnarfjardar swimming pool (64°4′22.02″N 21°58′7.62″W)
  - Setbergshamar cliff (64°4′16.08″N 21°55′57.96″W)
- Ásbyrgi (66°0′52″N 16°30′12″W)
- Lambi
- Álfhólsvegur (Elf Hill Road), a street in Kópavogur (64°6′40.62″N 21°52′12.66″W)
- Álfaborg in Borgarfjörður eystri (65°31′19.57″N 13°48′27.76″W)
- Búðarbrekkur in Brimnes (65°57′8.7″N 19°28′54.78″W)
- Grundarfjörður
- Stapafell (64°46′23.7″N 23°39′28.2″W)
- Tungustapi (65°15′18.66″N 21°48′23.64″W)
- Svalþúfa (64°44′10.62″N 23°46′59.28″W)
- Skuggahlíðarbjarg (65°6′19.2″N 13°49′28.74″W)
- Grímsey (66°32′39.92″N 18°0′16.74″W)
- The attic of Gimli Public School 1915 in the New Iceland Heritage Museum, Gimli, Manitoba (50°38′3.01″N 96°59′14.75″W)

== Modern cultural references ==
- In the 2018 musical Frozen, based on the 2013 film of the same name, the characters which were depicted in the original movie as trolls, became in the Broadway show a reference to the Huldufólk, named in the musical "the hidden folk".
- Huldufólk is the title of French Nordic folk group SKÁLD's 2023 album.
- In the plot of the 2020 film Eurovision Song Contest: The Story of Fire Saga Huldufólk are called upon by Sigrit Ericksdóttir to help them win the Eurovision Song Contest
- In the 2024 video game Senua's Saga: Hellblade II, the Huldufólk, or hiddenfolk as they're called, appear as voices that guide Senua during certain points of her journey through Midgard. Their faces sometimes appear in the environment, and the environment shifts when they are present or when Senua uses their magic to solve puzzles

== See also ==
- Icelandic: Álagablettur
- Domovoy
- Gnome
- Old Norse: Huldra
- Kabouter
- Greek: Kallikantzaros
- Ainu: Korpokkur
- Swedish: Skogsrå
- Troll
- Māori: Taniwha
- Old Norse: Vættir
- Swedish: Vittra
- Sami languages: Ulddat
