= Labour Court (Iceland) =

- Félagsdómur
- Established: 11 June 1938
- Jurisdiction: Iceland
- Location: Kópavogur
- Composition method: 1 appointment by the Confederation of Icelandic Employers; 1 appointment by the Icelandic Confederation of Labour; 1 appointment by the Minister of Social Affairs after Supreme Court nomination 2 appointments by the Supreme Court
- Authorised by: Trade Unions and Industrial Disputes Act No. 80/1938
- Appeals to: Supreme Court
- Judge term length: 3 years
- Number of positions: 5 (by statute)
- Website: felagsdomur.is (in Icelandic)

President
- Currently: Arnfríður Einarsdóttir

The Labour Court (Icelandic: Félagsdómur) is a special lower court in Iceland established in 1938 to handle industrial disputes between trade unions and employer associations.

== See also ==
- National Court
