= Sögufélag =

Icelandic historical society

Sögufélag (Icelandic pronunciation: [ˈsœːɣʏˌfjɛːˌlaːɣ], lit. 'Historical Society') is an Icelandic historical society. Founded in 1902, its original aim was to publish key primary sources in Icelandic history. The society's scope has broadened since then and today it hosts conferences and other social occasions, and publishes historical books along with the academic journal Saga.

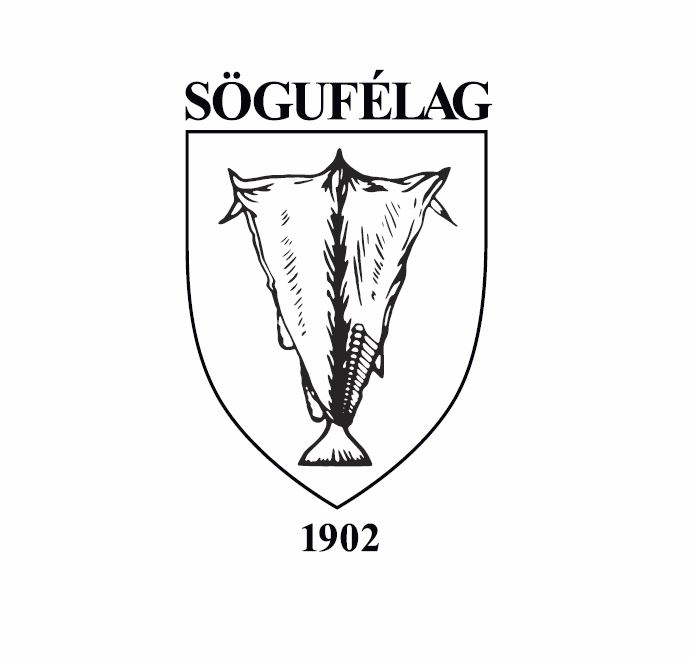
From 1982, the logo of Sögufélag has been a flattened cod on a shield.

Members of Sögufélag include historians of Iceland, history students and other history enthusiasts.

== History ==
Founding

Sögufélag was established in Reykjavík in 1902 around the publication of Icelandic primary sources. At the time, many of the key primary sources in Icelandic history were inaccessible to both the general reader and researchers. It is therefore no coincidence that among the three main instigators to the establishment, were the National Archivist Jón Þorkelsson and later-to-be National Archivist Hannes Þorsteinsson. The third catalyst was Jósafat Jósafatsson genealogist (more commonly known as Steinn Dofri).

== Publishing ==
=== Early publishing ===
In the first few decades, most of the society's attention was directed towards the publication of books and pamphlets. Aldarfarsbók Páls lögmanns Vídalíns 1700-1709, in 1904, was the first book to be published.

Sögufélag's most extensive publication-project began in 1912, when the first volume of Alþingisbækur Íslands (the records of the Icelandic parliament 1570–1800) was first published. The last volume (no. XVII) of that series was not to be issued until 1990.

The publication of Jón Árnason's folktales begun in 1925. The folktales were in high demand and served as a great implementer to increase membership, since one had to be a member of the society in order to purchase a copy.

=== Series ===
Along with single publications, Sögufélag has published a number of series:

- Safn Sögufélags, are translated early modern books about Iceland and Icelanders. The series includes works such as Crymogæa by Arngrímur Jónsson, translated from Latin by Jakob Benediktsson.
- Smárit Sögufélags, is a series of short books, each on a determinate subject.
- Alþingisbækur Íslands, are the records of the Icelandic parliament 1570–1800, published in 17 volumes.
- Safn til sögu Reykjavíkur, is a series of five books on the history of Reykjavík, mainly containing primary sources.
- Landsnefndin fyrri 1770-1771, are the documents of Landsnefndin fyrri (the first national commission), published by Sögufélag in collaboration with the National Archives of Iceland.
- Landsyfirréttardómar og hæstaréttardómar í íslenskum málum, are the records of the Icelandic high court, and the Danish Supreme Court on Icelandic matters from 1800 to 1919.

=== Journals ===
The leaders of Sögufélag soon realised that the publication of primary sources, albeit necessary, did not do much to engage the general reader. It was therefore decided to issue a journal where history enthusiasts could access readable history in narrative form.

Blanda (1918–1953)

Blanda was first published in 1918. Along with curiosities from primary sources, the journal issued short articles and was quickly held in high regard by readers. Blanda was issued in unbound sheets, usually one a year, with several sheets comprising one volume. Most of the journal's material was written by members sitting on the board of the society. In 1945, it was decided to terminate the publication of Blanda, with the last volume being issued in 1953.

Saga (since 1950)

In the purpose of issuing a journal that would adhere more rigorously to modern standards and academic historical writing, Saga was created in 1950 and replaced Blanda. Like its precursor, Saga was at first published in sheets. As a result, labelled annual publications are much fewer than the actual years over which the journal has been published. Since 2002, Saga has been published biannually. Saga is the main venue for debate and discussion between Icelandic historians.

Ný saga (1987–2001)

In 1987, Sögufélag started to publish another journal along with Saga, Ný saga. The origins of Ný saga can be traced back to the journal Sagnir, which was first issued in 1980 by history students at the University of Iceland. Much like Sagnir, the purpose of Ný saga was to be more accessible than Saga and contain easy-to-read material richly decorated with pictures. Along with that, several new columns were introduced where historical matters were debated. Publication of Ný saga was terminated in 2001, when it was decided to publish Saga biannually.

== Presidents of Sögufélag ==
1. Jón Þorkelsson, National Archivist (1902–1924)
2. Hannes Þorsteinsson, National Archivist (19024-1935)
3. Einar Arnórsson, Minister for Iceland (1935–1955)
4. Þorkell Jóhannesson, Rector and National Librarian (1955–1960)
5. Björn Þorsteinsson, Professor (1965–1978)
6. Einar Laxness, Archivist (1978–1988)
7. Heimir Þorleifsson, Teacher (1988–2001)
8. Loftur Guttormsson, Professor (2001–2005)
9. Anna Agnarsdóttir, Professor (2005–2011)
10. Guðni Th. Jóhannesson, Professor and President of Iceland (2011–2015)
11. Hrefna Róbertsdóttir, National Archivist (2015–2025)
12. Lóa Steinunn Kristjánsdóttir (2025-)
