= 2019 in Iceland =

- Decades: 1990s; 2000s; 2010s; 2020s
- See also: Other events of 2019; Timeline of Icelandic history

Events in the year 2019 in Iceland.

== Incumbents ==
- President: Guðni Th. Jóhannesson
- Prime Minister: Katrín Jakobsdóttir

== Events ==
- August 18 – 100 activists, officials, and other concerned citizens in Iceland hold a funeral for Okjökull glacier, which has completely melted after once covering 15.5 km^{2} (6 sq mi).

== Deaths ==
- 2 April – Jón Helgason, 87, MP (1974–1995), Minister of Justice (1983–1987) and Agriculture (1987–1988).
- 15 July – Thorsteinn I. Sigfusson, 65, physicist.
- 31 December – Guðrún Ögmundsdóttir, 69, politician

== See also ==
- 2019 European Parliament election
