= 2022 Iceland terror plot =

- Date: September 2022
- Location: Iceland
- Type: Alleged terrorist plot
- Target: Icelandic institutions and citizens
- Suspects: Sindri Snær Birgisson, Ísidór Nathansson
- Charges: Attempted terrorism, weapons violations

The 2022 Iceland terror plot was an alleged plot to target Icelandic institutions and citizens of the state in September 2022. On 21 September, the Icelandic police arrested two individuals and seized dozens of firearms, including semi-automatic pistols and 3D-printed weapons, along with large amount of ammunition during a search in nine different locations. The alleged plot, which would be the first of its kind in the history of Iceland, was believed to include attacks on members of the police and the Icelandic parliament the Alþingi. The individuals further discussed murdering several high profile individuals, including Guðlaugur Þór Þórðarson, the Minister for the Environment and Natural Resources, Sólveig Anna Jónsdóttir, the chairman of the workers union Efling, and Gunnar Smári Egilsson, the chairman of the Icelandic Socialist Party.

== Legal proceedings ==
On 9 December 2022, the two men were formally charged with attempted terrorism and weapons violations.

The terrorism charges against the men, now publicly identified as Sindri Snær Birgisson and Ísidór Nathansson, were dismissed in March 2023. New charges were filed in June 2023, and those charges were dismissed in October 2023, but were reinstated by the Court of Appeal.

On 12 March 2024, both individuals where acquitted of the terrorism charge in district courts, but were convicted of weapons offenses; Sindri was sentenced to 2 years in prison, while Ísidór was sentenced to 18 months. The Court of Appeal uppheld the decision of the district court. In March 2026 however, the Supreme Court of Iceland sent the case back to the Court of Appeal, stating that the court had not conducted a comprehensive assessment of the case's data and not assessed it in the context of the weapons offenses for which they were convicted.

== Reactions ==
In an interview with Stöð 2, National Police Commissioner Sigríður Björk Guðjónsdóttir, stated that there was no reason to raise the risk assessment due to threat of terrorism in the country following the arrests as the danger had surpassed.

The day after the arrests, the Icelandic neo-Nazi organization Norðurvígi made a statement where they denied any association with arrested individuals.
