= Audur Capital =

Auður Capital (Icelandic pronunciation: [ˈœyːðʏr]) was a financial service company, founded in 2007 by two Icelandic businesswomen, with the aim of incorporating feminine values into finance. Halla Tómasdóttir was Auður's executive chairman and Kristín Pétursdóttir was the company CEO.

The company offered wealth management, private equity advice and corporate advice. It attempted to correct what it perceived as a historic lack of balance and diversity in the financial sector. The founders blamed the 2007 financial downturn on high-risk behavior, short-term orientation and a narrow definition of results which had driven the financial sector for the past years.

Auður succeeded in preserving the funds of its clients when the Icelandic banks collapsed in October 2008.

In December 2008 Auður announced the launching of BJÖRK, a private equity fund, established by Auður Capital and the renowned musician Björk Guðmundsdóttir, who is an active supporter of entrepreneurship, creative thinking and increased diversity in the Icelandic economy. The aim of the BJÖRK venture fund was to invest in early-stage corporations, with high growth potential capitalizing on Iceland's human and/or natural resources, as well as emphasizing sustainability and a triple bottom line.

Auður received significant international attention. The Auður story has been featured by the BBC, New York Magazine, The Guardian, and The Financial Times, among others. Halla Tomasdóttir spoke at the 2010 TED Women's Conference on her financial philosophy.

== Merger in 2014 ==
Auður Capital started its operations in 2007 and merged with the financial services firm Virðing in January 2014. The merged company operates under the name Virðing.

The Icelandic Competition Authority authorized the merger at the end of 2013 as well as the Icelandic Financial Supervisory Authority in January 2014.

Virðing owns the Auður Capital brand and operates several private equity funds using the "Auður" name.
