= Hjörtur Torfason =

Icelandic attorney and judge (1935–2025)

- Born: September 19, 1935; Ísafjörður, Kingdom of Iceland
- Died: May 12, 2025 (aged 89); Reykjavík, Iceland
- Education: University of Iceland; University of Toronto
- Occupations: Attorney, Supreme Court Justice
- Spouse: Nanna Þorláksdóttir
- Children: 3

Hjörtur Torfason (19 September 1935 – 12 May 2025) was an Icelandic attorney and later judge at the Supreme Court of Iceland. Hjörtur is father in law of former minister Svandís Svavarsdóttir. He was Iceland's delegate to the Venice Commission of the Council of Europe from 1998 to 2010, and a substitute thereafter.
