= Icelandic Elf School =

Organization

The Icelandic Elf School (Icelandic: Álfaskólinn) is an organization located in Reykjavík, Iceland, that teaches visitors about Icelandic folklore. The organization teaches about the hidden people and thirteen types of elves, entities purported by the institution to reside within Iceland. The school's principal, Magnús Skarphéðinsson, states:

Hidden people are just the same size and look exactly like human beings, the only difference is that they are invisible to most of us. Elves, on the other hand, aren’t entirely human, they’re humanoid, starting at around eight centimeters.

The Icelandic Elf School publishes materials on hidden people, which serve both as an educational resource and a teaching aid within the classroom.

Established in 1991, the school arranges educational excursions lasting approximately five hours for its visitors. Since opening the institution has welcomed more than 9,000 attendees, the majority of whom are foreign. Other services provided by the Álfaskólinn include aura readings and explorations into past lives.

== See also ==
- Fairy Investigation Society
- Cottingley Fairies
