= Álagablettur =

Álagablettur (Icelandic pronunciation: [ˈauːˌlaːɣaˌplehtʏr̥]) means "power places," "spelled spots," or "enchanted spots" in Icelandic. Icelanders believe that huldufólk live in these areas, and leave them alone. However, only 2-5% of Icelanders claimed to have experienced Álagablettur.

According to folklore, an "álagablettur" is a specific area that is subject to some kind of taboo or ban, so that if the ban is broken, something bad will happen. Many "álagablettir" are associated with hidden people, elves, and elf settlements, as well as burial mounds or burial places, old sanctuaries, or places where accidents or crimes have occurred. The prohibitions usually involve not disturbing the site, using it (such as cutting grass or picking berries), pointing at it, or throwing stones at it.

"Álagablettir" are often associated with folk tales that explain the taboo and the origin of the prohibition, but there are also examples of "álagablettir" where no story exists, or where the story may have been lost from people's memory. There are examples of "álagablettir" that have been linked to stories later on, and that they have been associated with different stories at different times. Similarly, there are examples of "álagablettir" that have been moved or forgotten about.

== Examples ==
"Álagablettur" at Laugarvatn: Margrét from Öxnarfell was a clairvoyant woman. She claimed to have seen elves living in a moss that was part of the hills at Laugarvatn, but that the moss was a "álagablettur". However, one time a farmer from Gíslabær cut the moss and harvested a significant amount of hay. The following winter, the farmer lost his best cows, and since then no one dared to touch the moss. (Oral source from an interview).

"Álagablettur" in Eyjafjörður: Near Laufás in Eyjafjörður, there is a farm called Borgargerði. There is a small hill there that cannot be cut, as it would result in the hidden people who have control over the hill, killing a cow belonging to the farmer. Up in the mountain, there are several birch branches, remnants of an old forest, that cannot be broken, as it would result in a curse from the hidden people who have ownership of the branches. (Story from bishop Þórhallur Bjarnarson).
