= National Court (Iceland) =

Special high court to handle suspected crimes committed by Icelandic Cabinet ministers

- Landsdómur
- Established: 1905
- Jurisdiction: Iceland
- Location: Reykjavík
- Composition method: 5 Supreme Court justices; President of the Reykjavík District Court; Professor of constitutional law at the University of Iceland; 8 appointments by Parliament
- Authorised by: Constitution No. 33/1944; National Court Act No. 3/1963
- Judge term length: 6 years (Parliament appointees)
- Number of positions: 15 (by statute)
- Website: landsdómur.is (in Icelandic)

The National Court (Icelandic: Landsdómur [ˈlan(t)sˌtouːmʏr̥]) is a special high court in Iceland established in 1905 to handle cases where members of the Cabinet are suspected of criminal behaviour.

== Composition ==
The National Court has 15 members: five Supreme Court justices, the Reykjavík District Court President, a professor of constitutional law at the University of Iceland and eight people chosen by the Parliament every six years.

== Assembly ==
The court assembled for the first time in 2011, to prosecute former Prime Minister Geir Haarde for alleged gross misconduct in the events leading up to the 2008–2011 Icelandic financial crisis. On September 28, 2010, the Parliament decided, by 33 votes to 30, to charge Haarde. Originally faced with six charges, he was convicted only on one that was considered to be a minor one.

== See also ==
- Labour Court
- Cour de Justice de la République
