= Jónsmessa =

Icelandic midsummer holiday

Jónsmessa (Icelandic pronunciation: [ˈjounsˌmɛsːa]; lit. 'John's Mass'), also known as Midsummer Night, is an Icelandic holiday celebrated on June 24 and named after John the Baptist. According to Icelandic folklore, cows gain the powers of speech, seals become human, and it is healthy to roll naked in the dew-covered grass on Jónsmessa. Icelandic folklore also states that if you sit at a crossroads where all four roads lead to separate churches all night, elves will attempt to seduce you with food and gifts.
