= Hjördís Björk Hákonardóttir =

Icelandic lawyer and judge

Hjördís Björk Hákonardóttir (born 28 August 1944) is an Icelandic lawyer. She served as a judge of the Supreme Court of Iceland from 1 May 2006 to 31 July 2010. She has also written articles on the law, including Right to Life: a Principle of Equality, published in English in 2015.

Born in Reykjavík on 28 August 1944, Hjördís Björk Hákonardóttir matriculated from the Menntaskólinn í Reykjavík in 1964 and went on to study law at the University of Iceland, graduating in 1971. She then continued her law studies at Oxford University (1971–1974) and at Rutgers University in the United States, where she earned a master's degree in 1979. In the 1990s, she also carried out research at Georgetown University in Washington, D.C., and in Copenhagen.
