= Public holidays in Iceland =

Public holidays in Iceland are established by the act of the Icelandic parliament. The public holidays are the religious holidays of the Church of Iceland and the First Day of Summer, May Day, the Icelandic National Day. In addition, Christmas Eve and New Year's Eve are holidays from 1 PM.

There are also twelve official flag days in Iceland, some of which are not public holidays. On a flag day all government buildings fly the flag. Although citizens are not obliged to do it, most people do, if they have a flagpole.

== Public holidays ==
Date	English name	Local name	Comment
1 January	New Year's Day	Nýársdagur	Flag day
Moveable	Maundy Thursday	Skírdagur	Literal meaning: Christening day
Moveable	Good Friday	Föstudagurinn langi	Flag day (flown at half-mast) Literal meaning: Long Friday.
Moveable	Easter Sunday	Páskadagur	Flag day
Moveable	Easter Monday	Annar í páskum	Literal meaning: Second day of Easter
Moveable	First Day of Summer	Sumardagurinn fyrsti	Flag day Thursday between 19 and 25 April
1 May	May Day	Verkalýðsdagurinn	Flag day Literal meaning: Labour Day
Moveable	Ascension Day	Uppstigningardagur	
Moveable	Whit Sunday	Hvítasunnudagur	Flag day
Moveable	Whit Monday	Annar í hvítasunnu	Literal meaning: Second in White Sunday
17 June	National Day	Þjóðhátíðardagurinn	Flag day Commemorates the foundation of the republic. Typically referred to as "17. júní".
Moveable	Commerce Day	Frídagur verslunarmanna	First Monday in August. The long weekend is usually the largest domestic travel weekend
24 December	Christmas Eve	Aðfangadagur	Holiday from 13:00
25 December	Christmas Day	Jóladagur	Flag day
26 December	Second Day of Christmas	Annar í jólum	Literal meaning: Second Day of Christmas
31 December	New Year's Eve	Gamlársdagur	Literal meaning: Old Year's Day. Holiday from 13:00

== Other days that are celebrated ==
In addition to the public holidays, other special days are celebrated in Iceland, some of which are official flagdays as well.

Date	English name	Local name	Literal meaning	Remarks
6 January	Epiphany	Þrettándinn	The Thirteenth	
Moveable	Husband's Day	Bóndadagur		Friday between 19 and 25 January
Moveable	Woman's Day	Konudagur		Sunday between 18 and 24 February
1 March	Beer Day	Bjórdagurinn		Celebrates the legalization of beer in Iceland, 1 March 1989.
Moveable	Shrove Monday	Bolludagur	Bun Day	
Moveable	Shrove Tuesday	Sprengidagur	Bursting Day	
Moveable	Ash Wednesday	Öskudagur	Ash Day	
Moveable	Palm Sunday	Pálmasunnudagur		
Moveable	Mother's Day	Mæðradagurinn		Second Sunday in May
Moveable	Fisherman's Day	Sjómannadagurinn		First Sunday in June. Flag day
19 June	Women's Rights Day	Kvenréttindadagurinn		
24 June	St John's Mass Day	Jonsmessa	John's Mass	St John the Baptist's Mass Day, also known as Midsummer Night
Moveable	Father's Day	Feðradagurinn		Second Sunday in November
16 November	Language Day	Dagur íslenskrar tungu		Flag day
1 December	Sovereignty Day	Fullveldisdagurinn	Independence Day	Flag day
23 December	St. Thorlac's Mass Day	Þorláksmessa		St Thorlac is Patron Saint of Iceland
