= Di sma undar jordi =

Creatures in Swedish folklore

Di sma undar jordi (Gutnish, Swedish: de små under jorden, lit. 'the small (ones) underground'), or simply di sma, are legendary vættir-like creatures found in folklore from the island of Gotland, Sweden. It is really the regional variation of the broader folklore of the "hidden people" (mainland Swedish: underjordiska, "subterraneans"). Di sma are said to take care of farms and the people and animals that live there, as long as one does not anger them. The most classical example of doing so is to mindlessly scald them when disposing hot water outdoors. According to Gotlandic tales, di sma can only be seen by looking through a hole in a sheet of paper.

The Swedish rauk'n'roll band Di sma undar jårdi, active in the 1980s, was named after these creatures.

== See also ==
- Tomte
