= Benedikt Bogason =

President of the Supreme Court of Iceland

Benedikt Bogason is an Icelander judge who has served as justice of Supreme Court of Iceland since October 1, 2012 and its president since January 1, 2022.
