= Saga (journal) =

Icelandic history academic journal

- Discipline: History of Iceland
- Language: Icelandic

Publication details
- History: 1949–present
- Publisher: Sögufélag (Iceland)
- Frequency: Biannual

Standard abbreviations
- ISO 4: Saga

Links
- Journal homepage; Online archive

Saga is a biannual peer-reviewed academic journal covering the history of Iceland. It is the official publication of the Icelandic historical society, Sögufélag. The journal was established in 1949 and has since then been the journal of choice for historians of Iceland.

All articles in Saga are subject to a double blind peer-review. Articles in Saga are written in Icelandic but accompanied by an English abstract.

The editors-in-chief are Kristín Svava Tómasdóttir and Vilhelm Vilhelmsson.
