= Sigurður Bragason =

Icelandic baritone

Sigurður Bragason (born 6 August 1954) is an Icelandic baritone.

He studied in Germany and Italy after graduating from the Conservatory of Music in Reykjavík. He is one of Iceland's best-known singers and is much sought after as interpreter of Icelandic, Russian, German and Italian songs. Sigurður Bragason is one of the best known baritone singers in Iceland. He has given recitals in many of the most well-known concert halls in Europe and the United States. On his repertoire there are all major songs by Verdi, Bellini, Donizetti, Tosti, Wagner, Schubert, Beethoven, Mozart, Mussorgsky, Liszt, Chopin, Tchaikovsky, and Rachmaninoff. He has given recitals in the Wigmore Hall in London, the Edvard Munch Museum in Oslo, the H. C. Andersen Music Hall in Odense, the Beethoven House in Bonn, The Corcoran Museum of Art in Washington DC, the Temppeliaukio Church in Helsinki, in the Palazzo Trabia in Sicily, the Chamber Music Hall of Carnegie Hall, the Royal Concertgebouw in Amsterdam, the Richard Wagnersaal in Riga with the Baltic Philharmony Orchestra, the Scandinavia House in New York, in St. John's Smith Square in London, and in The John F. Kennedy Centre for the Performing Arts in Washington DC

== International career ==
His international career has taken him to music festivals and such renowned concert halls in Europe and the United States as the Royal Concertgebouw in Amsterdam 1998, Beethoven-Haus in Bonn 1992, 1993 and 1998, Temppeliaukion Kirkko (The Rock-Church) in Helsinki 1997 and 1998, the Weill Recital Hall at Carnegie Hall in New York 1996 and 2000, the Wigmore Hall in London 1993 and 2001 and the John F. Kennedy Memorial Center for the Performing Arts in 2003.

Bragason has also given recitals in music festivals and concerts series, such as the Encountros festival for modern music in Buenos Aires the Copenhagen European City of Culture festival, Grieg festival in Bergen, Concerti di Sacristia di Borromini in Rome, in the Bevagna music festival in Umbria, the Ibla music festival in Ragusa and the music festival of Catania and I Concerti d´Altamarca in the Veneto, Sorrento and Amalfy. He was a soloist with the Sarband orchestra of Vladimir Ivanoff in Bayreuth and the Deutsche Welle Music Room in Bonn.

His operatic roles include Prince Kalman in the Mondschein Insel by the Nordic Music Prize laureate Atli Heimir Sveinsson at the Nordrhein-Westfalen Cultural Festival in Cologne, Bonn and Bielefeld. Also as Sacristan in Tosca at the Icelandic National Theatre, Marcello in La Boheme in the Reykjavík City Theatre, Black Bob in Lets Make an Opera by Benjamin Britten in the Icelandic Opera and Aeneas in Dido and Aeneas by Purcell. He has performed arias by Wagner and Mozart with the Iceland Symphony Orchestra and been a soloist in Messiah, Bach cantatas, Vespro della Beata Vergine by Monteverdi and Carmina Burana by Carl Orff under the conductor Willy Gohl.

== Musical work ==
Sigurður has also appeared in Tosca, La Boheme, The Magic Flute, Let’s Make an Opera, Dido and Aeneas, Carmina Burana under Willy Gohl, Messias, Bach Cantatas and Vespro della Beata Vergine by Monteverdi to name few of his musical roles. In 1995 Sigurður sang the lead role specially written for him in a new Icelandic opera “The Moonlight Island” by the Nordic Music Prize composer Atli Heimir Sveinsson on a tournee in Germany. Sigurður Bragason has appeared in several Radio and TV programs such as the Comparing Notes program in the BBC, in the Icelandic State Radio with the Iceland Symphony Orchestra under the conductor Alvaro Manzano and in the Mondschein Insel in the West Deutsche Rundfunk in Germany. Bragason's first CD was“Icelandic and Italian songs” and then “Songs of Light and Darkness” with works by Tosti, Donizetti, Verdi, Respighi and Mussorgsky“ “Songs of the Master Pianists” with works by Chopin, Liszt, Rachmaninoff, Ravel and Rubinstein where he was accompanied by pianist Vovka Ashkenazy, “Mozart Arias” with the Baltic Symphony Orchestra and “Life and Lyrics” with Icelandic songs.

He is a sought-after interpreter of songs by the Icelandic composer Jón Leifs and has appeared in several television and radio programmes including WDR in Germany and BBC's “Comparing Notes”.

== Discography ==
Songs of Light and Darkness with works by Tosti, Donizetti, Verdi, Respighi and Mussorgsky

Songs of the Master Pianists with works by Chopin, Liszt, Rachmaninoff, Ravel and Rubinstein accompanied by pianist Vovka Ashkenazy,

Mozart Arias with the Baltic Symphony Orchestra

Líf og ljóð (Life and poems) Icelandic songs, accompanied by pianist Hjálmur Sighvatsson

== Sources ==
- Samtíðarmenn 2003, Biography: Sigurður Bragason (in Icelandic)

== See also ==
- Icelandic singers
- Music of Iceland
