= Dóra Ólafsdóttir =

Icelandic centenarian (1912–2022)

- Born: 6 July 1912; Kljáströnd, Grýtubakkahreppur, Iceland
- Died: 4 February 2022 (aged 109); Reykjavík, Iceland
- Known for: Longevity
- Spouse: Þórir Áskelsson (m. 1943; died 2000)
- Children: 2

Dóra Ólafsdóttir (6 July 1912 – 4 February 2022) was an Icelandic centenarian. On 13 December 2021, she became the oldest Icelander ever, breaking Jensína Andrésdóttir's record of 109 years and 159 days.

== Biography ==
Dóra was born on 6 July 1912 on Sigtún at Kláströnd in Grýtubakkahreppur in Iceland. At the age of six, she witnessed the 1918 major eruption of Katla. She studied at Gagnfræðaskólinn á Akureyri and later moved to Copenhagen in Denmark. After moving back to Iceland, Dóra worked for Landssíminn for 40-years. Dóra was married to Þórir Áskelsson from 15 February 1943 until his death in December 2000. Together they had two children. In 2012, she moved to Kópavogur to live with her son for a short while. She became the oldest living Icelander in 2019 following the death of Jensína Andrésdóttir. Dóra died on 4 February 2022, at the age of 109.
