= Hrafn Jökulsson =

Icelandic writer (1965–2022)

- Born: 1 November 1965; Reykjavík, Iceland
- Died: 17 September 2022 (aged 56)
- Occupation(s): Writer, journalist, parliamentarian
- Spouse: Oddný Halldórsdóttir (m. 2022)
- Relatives: Elísabet Jökulsdóttir (sister)

Hrafn Jökulsson (1 November 1965 – 17 September 2022) was an Icelandic writer, journalist, politician and competitive chess player. He was best known for his writing, both as a writer and a journalist. He started working at Tíminn at the age of fifteen and later held the position of editor of Alþýðublaðið and Mannlíf. He was a deputy member of Alþingi in 1995 for the Social Democratic Party. In 1998, he was one of the founders and later chairman of the Skákfélagið Hrókurinn, a competitive chess club.

== Personal life ==
Hrafn was the son of journalist Jóhanna Kristjónsdóttir and writer Jökull Jakobsson. Among his siblings were writers Elísabet Jökulsdóttir and Illugi Jökulsson.

In 2022, Hrafn was diagnosed with a fourth stage cancer. On 22 August, he married Oddný Halldórsdóttir. He died from the illness on 17 September 2022, at the age of 56.

== Bibliography ==
- 1991: Húsinu fylgdu tveir kettir
- 1993: Þegar hendur okkar snertast
- 1999: Miklu meira en mest
- 2007: Þar sem vegurinn endar
