= Court of Appeal (Iceland) =

- Landsréttur
- Established: 7 June 2016
- Jurisdiction: Iceland
- Location: Reykjavík
- Composition method: Presidential appointment after Minister of Justice nomination following Qualifications Committee selection. Parliamentary confirmation before appointment if minister nomination differs from committee selection.
- Authorised by: Courts Act No. 50/2016
- Appeals to: Supreme Court
- Appeals from: District courts
- Judge term length: Life tenure
- Number of positions: 15 (by statute)
- Annual budget: 703.8 million ISK (2019)
- Website: landsrettur.is (in Icelandic)

President
- Currently: Hervör Þorvaldsdóttir

Vice-President
- Currently: Eiríkur Jónsson

The Court of Appeal (Icelandic: Landsréttur, lit. National Court) is an appellate court in Iceland with appellate jurisdiction over all district court cases. The court was established by the Courts Act of 2016 and began operating 1 January 2018. The establishment introduced a three-tier judiciary in Iceland where before operated only district courts and the Supreme Court since the 1919 abolition of the National High Court.

The court is composed of fifteen justices selected by the Qualifications Committee and nominated by the Minister of Justice for presidential confirmation. In cases where the minister wishes to make changes to the committee's selection, Parliament must approve of said changes with a simple majority vote.
