= Anna Agnarsdóttir =

Icelandic academic (born 1947)

- Born: 14 May 1947 (age 78); Reykjavík, Iceland
- Occupation: Professor
- Spouse: Ragnar Árnason
- Children: 2

Academic background
- Education: University of Sussex (B.A., 1970); University of Iceland (B.A., 1972)
- Alma mater: London School of Economics and Political Science (Ph.D., 1989)

Anna Agnarsdóttir (born 14 May 1947) is an Icelandic historian. She is a Professor Emeritus of History at the University of Iceland.

== Early life ==
Anna was born in Reykjavík. Her parents were Ólöf Bjarnadóttir (1919–1999) and Agnar Kl. Jónsson (1909–1984), ambassador and permanent secretary of the Ministry of Foreign Affairs. She was raised in London and Paris during the years 1951–1961 and graduated with a matriculation examination from Reykjavík Grammar School in 1967.

== Professional career ==
Anna completed a BA (Hons) degree in history from the University of Sussex in 1970 and a BA in Icelandic History from the University of Iceland in 1972. She defended her PhD thesis in International History at the London School of Economics and Political Science in 1989, titled "Great Britain and Iceland 1800–1820." The thesis dealt with political and economic relations between Iceland and Britain during the early 19th century.

Anna began working as a part-time lecturer at the University of Iceland shortly after 1980, was appointed associate professor of history in 1990 after earning her Ph.D., and in 2004, she became the first woman to be appointed as Professor in that discipline. She has been professor emeritus since retiring in 2017.

== Research ==
Her primary research interests are European and Icelandic history from 1500 to 1830: in particular relations between Iceland and the wider world, especially Britain, and the history of trade and exploration. The aim of her research has, for example, been to throw light on the fact that though Iceland was in the early modern period geographically isolated from Europe, European trends generally made their way to Iceland and Icelandic history should be viewed as an integral part of European history. Currently, she is researching relations between France and Iceland in the 18th century, after the Seven Years' War. At that time, France showed interest in acquiring Iceland, a dependency of Denmark, in exchange for Louisiana. Iceland would serve as a naval base from which France could attempt the recovery of Canada.

Her most comprehensive work is Sir Joseph Banks, Iceland and the North Atlantic. Journals, Letters and Documents 1772–1820 (Routledge, 2016). She wrote about the period from 1800 to 1830 in Saga Íslands (e. History of Iceland) (volume IX) and is among the authors of the work Líftaug landsins (e. Lifeline of the Country) (2017) which covers the history of Icelandic foreign trade during the period 900–2010. The book was nominated for the Icelandic literary award in the category of academic works. Among recent works is a chapter in the second volume of the Cambridge History of Scandinavia (2016).

Anna has written many articles and book chapters in domestic and foreign academic works. She has written about the Icelandic Revolution of 1809, plans for the annexation of Iceland during the Napoleonic Wars, Sir Joseph Banks's expedition to Iceland in 1772, historical sources and ties between Greenland and Iceland, to name but a few topics. She has held many lectures both in Iceland and abroad, for example, a few times by invitation of the Royal Society, London.

== Various tasks and projects ==
Anna has co-edited the journals Saga (e. History), the major historical journal in Iceland and Ný saga (e. New History), and numerous books. Among these can be mentioned Kvennaslóðir, Rit until heiðurs Sigríði Th. Erlendsdóttur sagnfræðingi (e. Festschrift honouring the historian Sigríður Th. Erlendsdóttir), a book comprising articles by all active Icelandic female historians in the year 2000, and Ferðadagbækur Magnúsar Stephensen 1807–1808 (e. Travel Diaries of Magnús Stephensen 1807–1808) with Þórir Stephensen (Reykjavík, 2010).

She has been active in the academic community of Icelandic historians both within and outside the university. She was Head of the Faculty of Philosophy during the years 2002–2004, representative of the academic community in the University Council during 2008–2012, the first woman to be appointed President of the Historical Society 2005–2011, and is currently chair of the Board of the National Archives of Iceland. Furthermore, she serves on the board of the Banks Archive Project and is Iceland's representative in the Hakluyt Society and the Scandinavia-Japan Sasakawa Foundation.

Anna is currently among many editors in the Hakluyt Edition Project which is an international collaboration. This is an academic publication of Richard Hakluyt's The Principal Navigations … of the English Nation (1598), which Oxford University Press will publish in the next few years.

== Recognition ==
Anna is an honorary member of the Icelandic Historical Society and an elected member of Det Kongelige Danske Selskab for Fædrelandets Historie and Societas scientiarum Islandica. In 2017, she was awarded the Knight's Cross of the Icelandic Order of the Falcon for her contribution to historical research.

== Personal life ==
Anna is married to Ragnar Árnason, Professor Emeritus of Economics at The University of Iceland. They have two daughters and Anna has one stepdaughter.
