= Elias Davidsson =

Icelandic composer (1941–2022)

Elias Davidsson (Icelandic spelling Elías Davíðsson; born Elias Kahn, 23 January 1941 - 7 April 2022) was an Icelandic composer, 9/11 truther and conspiracy theorist author.

== Biography ==
Elias Davidsson was born in Palestine to German Jewish parents who had emigrated from Germany in 1931 and 1935 respectively (he later replaced his original surname with the patronym Davidsson, in accordance with Icelandic naming conventions). Davidsson grew up in Tel Aviv and Jerusalem. Temporarily, he lived in France until he finally moved to Iceland in 1962 and became an Icelandic citizen. He studied piano and composition in Cologne, Freiburg and Basel. He worked as a programmer for 22 years. Davidsson lived in Germany since 2008. In 2022 he lived in Kirchen (Sieg). He died on 7 April 2022 in Germany.

== Music ==
While living in Iceland, Davidsson began composing avant-garde computer-assisted music. In 1976, his Piano Trio (with percussion) was performed at the Nordic Music Days in Reykjavík. This was followed by Landslög, a Fantasy based on Icelandic folk tunes. With Cheetahs, Impotent he presented a work for musical theatre. Subsequently, Elias Davidsson devoted himself increasingly to studying pieces for the piano. These include the Græna bókin ("Green Book") with 36 solo pieces for piano, a collection of cello duets and the 18 piano duets The Red Carousel - Das Rote Karussell. Elias Davidsson plays accordion and lithophone in addition to piano.

== Journalism ==
Since the 1980s, Elias Davidsson had published on political topics, such as colonial history, human rights, economic sanctions and Zionism. His texts appeared in anthologies and various journals, and later he frequently published on the internet. Since 2013, he has written multiple books on terrorism, for example the attacks in Mumbai in 2008 and as a truther on the 11 September 2001. He rejected the conclusions of the 9/11 Commission and called them a "perfidious lie".

=== The Betrayal of India, 2017 ===
In 2017, Davidsson published a book in which he claimed that India was responsible for the 26/11 attacks.

== Publications (selection) ==
=== Compositions ===
- Guépardes impuissantes: musique pour 5 hommes; 3 musiciens (alto, clarinette, piano) & 2 assistants = Geparden impotent = cheetahs impotent. Partitur und Anweisungen. Roth, Zug 1975/1977.
- Græna bókin. 36 vinsæl íslensk lög í píanóútsetningum Elíasar Davíðssonar („Das Grüne Buch. 36 populäre isländische Lieder in Klavierarrangements von Elias Davidsson“). Tónar og Steinar, Reykjavik 1994.
- Celloduette und einige Stücke für 3 und 4 Violoncelli. Tónar og Steinar, Reykjavik 1995.
- Das rote Karussell. 18 leichte Klavierstücke, vierhändig. Isländisches Musik-Informationszentrum, Reykjavik 1989/Tónar og Steinar, Reykjavik 1999.

=== Books ===
- Die Vasalleninsel im Nordmeer. Alusuisse in Island, in: Tobias Bauer und andere: Alusuisse : eine Schweizer Kolonialgeschichte : Silbersonne am Horizont. Zürich : Limmat, 1989 ISBN 9783857911453, S. 153–175
- Hijacking America's Mind on 9/11: Counterfeiting Evidence, Algora Publishing, 2013, ISBN 978-0-87586-972-8
- Psychologische Kriegsführung und gesellschaftliche Leugnung: Die Legende des 9/11 und die Fiktion der Terrorbedrohung. Zambon-Verlag, Frankfurt am Main, 2017, ISBN 978-3-88975-252-9
- The Betrayal of India: Revisiting the 26/11 Evidence, Pharos Media, New Delhi, 2017, ISBN 978-81-7221-088-5
- Der gelbe Bus: Was geschah wirklich am Breitscheidplatz in Berlin?, Zambon, Frankfurt a. M., 2018, ISBN 978-3-88975-274-1
- The London Transport Bombings of 2005: Unsolved Crime, Kindle, eBook, 2019
- America’s Betrayal Confirmed: 9/11. Purpose, Cover-up and Impunity, Toost, 2020

== Literature ==
- John David White, Jean Christensen: New music of the Nordic countries, Pendragon Press, 2002, ISBN 978-1-57647-019-0, S. 342–344
