= Fjölnir Geir Bragason =

Icelandic tattoo artist (1965–2021)

- Born: 5 February 1965
- Died: 11 December 2021 (aged 56)
- Education: Icelandic School of Arts and Crafts
- Known for: Tattoos
- Father: Bragi Ásgeirsson

Fjölnir Geir Bragason (5 February 1965 – 11 December 2021) was an Icelandic tattoo artist. Commonly known as Fjölnir Tattoo, he was known as one of Iceland's foremost tattoo artists.

== Early life and education ==
Fjölnir started studying in preschool at the old Stýrimannaskólinn, then went to Breiðagerðisskóli, Hlíðaskóli and graduated from Menntaskólinn við Hamrahlíð in 1990. He graduated from the Icelandic School of Arts and Crafts in 2000, where his dissertation dealt with tattooing, but he had been working in the field since 1995.

== Personal life ==
Fjölnir was the son of artist Bragi Ásgeirsson.
