= List of justices of the Supreme Court of Iceland =

This is a list of justices of the Supreme Court of Iceland.

== List ==
#	Justice	Appointed	Served until	Tenure length
1	Halldór Daníelsson	1 December 1919	16 September 1923	3 years, 289 days
1	Kristján Jónasson	1 December 1919	2 July 1926	6 years, 213 days
1	Lárus Kristján Ingvaldur Hákonarson Bjarnason	1 December 1919	31 March 1931	11 years, 120 days
1	Eggert Ólafur Eggertsson Briem	1 December 1919	13 August 1935	15 years, 255 days
1	Páll Einarsson	1 December 1919	13 August 1935	15 years, 255 days
6	Einar Arnórsson	1 September 1932	30 April 1945	12 years, 241 days
7	Þórður Eyjólfsson	1 October 1935	31 December 1965	30 years, 91 days
7	Gizur Ísleifsson Bergsteinsson	1 October 1935	1 March 1972	36 years, 152 days
9	Jón Ásbjörnsson	1 May 1945	31 March 1960	14 years, 335 days
9	Árni Tryggvason	1 May 1945	31 May 1964	19 years, 30 days
9	Jónatan Hallvarðsson	1 May 1945	31 December 1969	24 years, 244 days
12	Lárus Jóhannesson	1 May 1960	10 March 1964	3 years, 314 days
13	Einar Arnalds	1 August 1964	29 February 1976	11 years, 212 days
13	Logi Einarsson	1 August 1964	31 December 1982	18 years, 152 days
15	Benedikt Sigurjónsson	1 January 1966	31 December 1981	15 years, 364 days
16	Gunnar Sigurðsson Thoroddsen	1 January 1970	16 September 1970	258 days
17	Magnús Þórarinn Torfason	15 November 1970	31 December 1987	17 years, 46 days
18	Ármann Snævarr	1 May 1972	31 October 1984	12 years, 183 days
19	Björn Sveinbjörnsson	22 June 1973	10 October 1985	12 years, 110 days
20	Þór Heimir Vilhjálmsson	1 March 1976	30 June 1995	19 years, 121 days
21	Sigurgeir Jóhannesson	1 August 1979	30 June 1986	6 years, 333 days
22	Halldór Þorbjörnsson	1 September 1982	31 August 1987	4 years, 364 days
23	Magnús Jónasson Thoroddsen	1 January 1982	8 December 1989	7 years, 341 days
24	Guðmundur Jónasson	1 January 1983	31 August 1991	8 years, 242 days
25	Guðmundur Skaftason	1 November 1984	31 December 1989	5 years, 60 days
26	Bjarni Kristinn Bjarnason	1 January 1986	31 December 1991	5 years, 364 days
27	Guðrún Erlendsdóttir	1 July 1986	15 April 2006	19 years, 288 days
28	Hrafn Bragason	1 September 1987	31 August 2007	19 years, 364 days
29	Benedikt Blöndal	11 February 1988	22 April 1991	3 years, 70 days
30	Haraldur Henrysson	1 January 1989	31 August 2003	14 years, 242 days
31	Hjörtur Torfason	1 March 1990	28 February 2001	10 years, 364 days
32	Gunnar Magnús Guðmundsson	1 June 1991	31 August 1994	3 years, 91 days
33	Pétur Kristján Hafstein	1 October 1991	30 September 2004	12 years, 365 days
34	Garðar Kristjánsson Gíslason	1 January 1992	30 September 2012	20 years, 273 days
35	Gunnlaugur Claessen	1 September 1994	31 August 2013	18 years, 364 days
36	Arnljótur Björnsson	11 August 1995	31 August 2000	5 years, 20 days
37	Árni Kolbeinsson	1 November 2000	28 February 2014	13 years, 119 days
38	Ingibjörg K. Benediktsdóttir	1 March 2001	28 February 2014	12 years, 364 days
39	Jón Steinar Gunnlaugsson	15 October 2004	30 September 2012	7 years, 351 days
40	Hjördís Björk Hákonardóttir	1 May 2006	31 July 2010	4 years, 91 days
41	Markús Sigurbjörnsson	1 July 1994	1 October 2019	25 years, 92 days
42	Ólafur Börkur Þorvaldsson	1 September 2003	Incumbent	22 years, 226 days
43	Páll Hreinsson	1 September 2007	15 September 2017	10 years, 14 days
44	Viðar Már Matthíasson	10 September 2010	Incumbent	15 years, 217 days
45	Eiríkur Tómasson	1 September 2011	31 August 2017	5 years, 364 days
45	Greta Baldursdóttir	1 September 2011	Incumbent	14 years, 226 days
45	Þorgeir Örlygsson	1 September 2011	Incumbent	14 years, 226 days
48	Benedikt Bogason	1 October 2012	Incumbent	13 years, 196 days
48	Helgi Ingólfur Jónsson	1 October 2012	Incumbent	13 years, 196 days
50	Karl Axelsson	12 October 2015	Incumbent	10 years, 185 days
