= Birgir Ármannsson =

Icelandic lawyer and politician (born 1968)

- Birgir at the NB8 parliamentary speakers' meeting in Latvia in 2024

Speaker of the Althing
- In office 1 December 2021 – 30 November 2024
- President: Guðni Th. Jóhannesson; Halla Tómasdóttir
- Prime Minister: Katrín Jakobsdóttir; Bjarni Benediktsson
- Preceded by: Steingrímur J. Sigfússon
- Succeeded by: Þórunn Sveinbjarnardóttir

Member of the Althing
- In office 2003 – 30 November 2024
- Constituency: Reykjavík South (2003–2013; 2021–2024); Reykjavík North (2013–2021)

Personal details
- Born: 12 June 1968 (age 58) Reykjavík, Iceland
- Party: Independence Party
- Spouse: Ragnhildur Hjördís Lövdahl
- Relations: Birgir Kjaran (maternal grandfather)
- Children: 3
- Education: Menntaskólinn í Reykjavík; University of Iceland; King's College London
- Profession: Lawyer

Birgir Ármannsson (born 12 June 1968) is an Icelandic lawyer and politician of the Independence Party. He served as a member of the Althing, Iceland's parliament, from 2003 to 2024 and as Speaker of the Althing from 2021 to 2024. He was chairman of the Independence Party's parliamentary group from 2017 to 2021.

== Early life and professional career ==
Birgir was born in Reykjavík on 12 June 1968. His parents were Ármann Sveinsson, a law student, and Helga Kjaran, a teacher. His maternal grandfather was Birgir Kjaran, who also served as a member of the Althing.

He graduated from Menntaskólinn í Reykjavík in 1988 and received a law degree from the University of Iceland in 1996. He qualified as an attorney with rights of audience before the district courts in 1999 and undertook postgraduate studies at King's College London from 1999 to 2000.

Birgir worked as a journalist for Morgunblaðið from 1988 to 1994. He joined the Iceland Chamber of Commerce in 1995, serving as a lawyer from 1996 to 1998, office manager from 1998 to 1999 and assistant managing director from 2000 until 2003.

He was chairman of Heimdallur, the Reykjavík organisation of young members of the Independence Party, from 1989 to 1991. He later served on the board of the Young Independents and was a member of the Independence Party's central committee from 1993 to 2003.

== Parliamentary career ==
Birgir was first elected to the Althing in the 2003 Icelandic parliamentary election. He represented Reykjavík South from 2003 to 2013, Reykjavík North from 2013 to 2021 and Reykjavík South again from 2021 until the end of his parliamentary career in 2024.

He served as a deputy speaker of the Althing from 2003 to 2007 and again from 2016 to 2017. He chaired the General Affairs Committee from 2007 to 2009 and the Foreign Affairs Committee from 2013 to 2015. From 2017 to 2021 he was chairman of the Independence Party's parliamentary group.

Birgir also took part extensively in international parliamentary cooperation. He chaired Iceland's delegation to the West Nordic Council from 2003 to 2005 and its delegation to the Parliamentary Assembly of the Council of Europe from 2005 to 2007. He later served on Iceland's delegations to the NATO Parliamentary Assembly and the Inter-Parliamentary Union.

=== Speaker of the Althing ===
Birgir became Speaker of the Althing on 1 December 2021, succeeding Steingrímur J. Sigfússon. He remained Speaker until the 2024 Icelandic parliamentary election on 30 November 2024.

As Speaker, he presided over the work of the Althing and represented the parliament in its international relations. His tenure included increased parliamentary engagement with Ukraine following the Russian invasion of Ukraine.

In October 2024, Birgir announced that he would not seek re-election, ending more than 21 years as a member of the Althing.

== Later career ==
After leaving the Althing, Birgir returned to legal practice. He works as an attorney at Lögfræðistofa Reykjavíkur in Reykjavík.

== Honours ==
=== National honours ===
- Iceland: Grand Cross of the Order of the Falcon (10 May 2024), awarded for official service.

=== Foreign honours ===
- Denmark: Knight Grand Cross of the Order of the Dannebrog (8 October 2024).
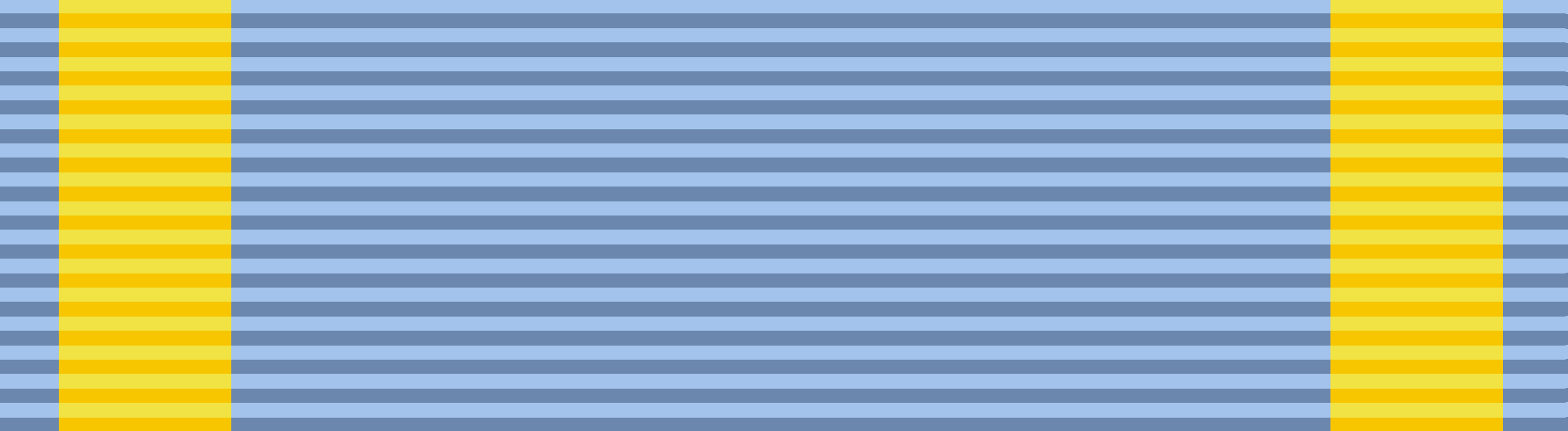
- Ukraine: Order of Prince Yaroslav the Wise, 2nd Class (18 October 2024), for his contribution to interstate cooperation and support for the sovereignty and territorial integrity of Ukraine.
