= Icelandic National Day =

National holiday in Iceland commemorating independence from Denmark (17 June 1944)

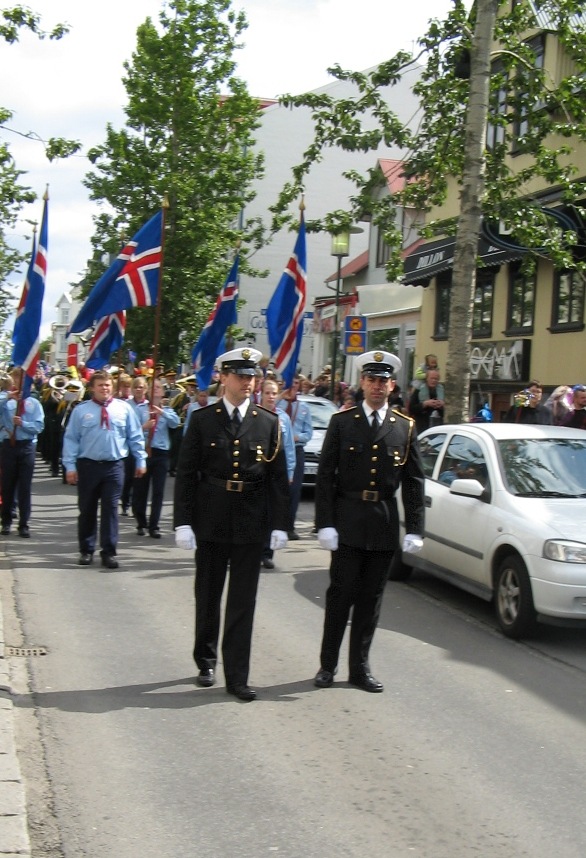
- The national day procession in Reykjavík June 17, 2007.
- Official name: Icelandic: Þjóðhátíðardagurinn
- Date: 17 June
- Next time: 17 June 2025
- Frequency: annual

Icelandic National Day (Icelandic: Þjóðhátíðardagurinn, the day of the nation's celebration) is an annual holiday in Iceland which commemorates the foundation of The Republic of Iceland on 17 June 1944. This date also marks the end of Iceland's centuries-old ties with Denmark. The date was chosen to coincide with the birthday of Jón Sigurðsson, a major figure of Icelandic culture and the leader of the 19th-century Icelandic independence movement.

== History ==
The formation of the republic was based on a clause in the 1918 Act of Union with Denmark, which allowed for a revision in 1943, as well as on the results of the 1944 plebiscite.

German occupation of Denmark meant that the revision of the Act of Union could not take place in 1943. However, the referendum on abolishing the monarchy went ahead in 1944 while Denmark was still occupied by Germany, and was overwhelmingly approved. At the time, the US military had taken over the defence of Iceland at Iceland's invitation, after being occupied by Britain in 1940. Although saddened by the results of the plebiscite, King Christian X sent a letter on 17 June 1944 congratulating Icelanders on the establishment of a republic.

Abolishing the monarchy resulted in little change to the Icelandic constitution, instances of "The King" simply being changed to "The President". Icelanders celebrated the severing of all formal ties with Denmark after centuries of sometimes difficult Danish rule. Iceland's national day was chosen as the birthday of Jón Sigurðsson who pioneered the early independence movement. Sveinn Björnsson became the country's first president.

== Celebrations ==
Today, Icelanders celebrate this holiday on a national scale. The celebration traditionally takes the form of parades through each city, town, and village, usually with a brass band leading the way. Riders on Icelandic horses often precede the brass band, and a flag-bearing troop from the Icelandic scout movement traditionally follows the band. After the parade speeches are held out in the open, including one from Fjallkonan (the woman of the mountain), clad in Skautbúningur, who recites a poem. She represents the fierce spirit of the Icelandic nation and of Icelandic nature. In many ways this recalls the period of romanticism that reigned when the first steps toward independence were taken. After the public speeches are over, less formal celebrations ensue, usually including a variety of musical performances.
