= First day of summer (Iceland) =

Annual public holiday in Iceland

First Day of Summer
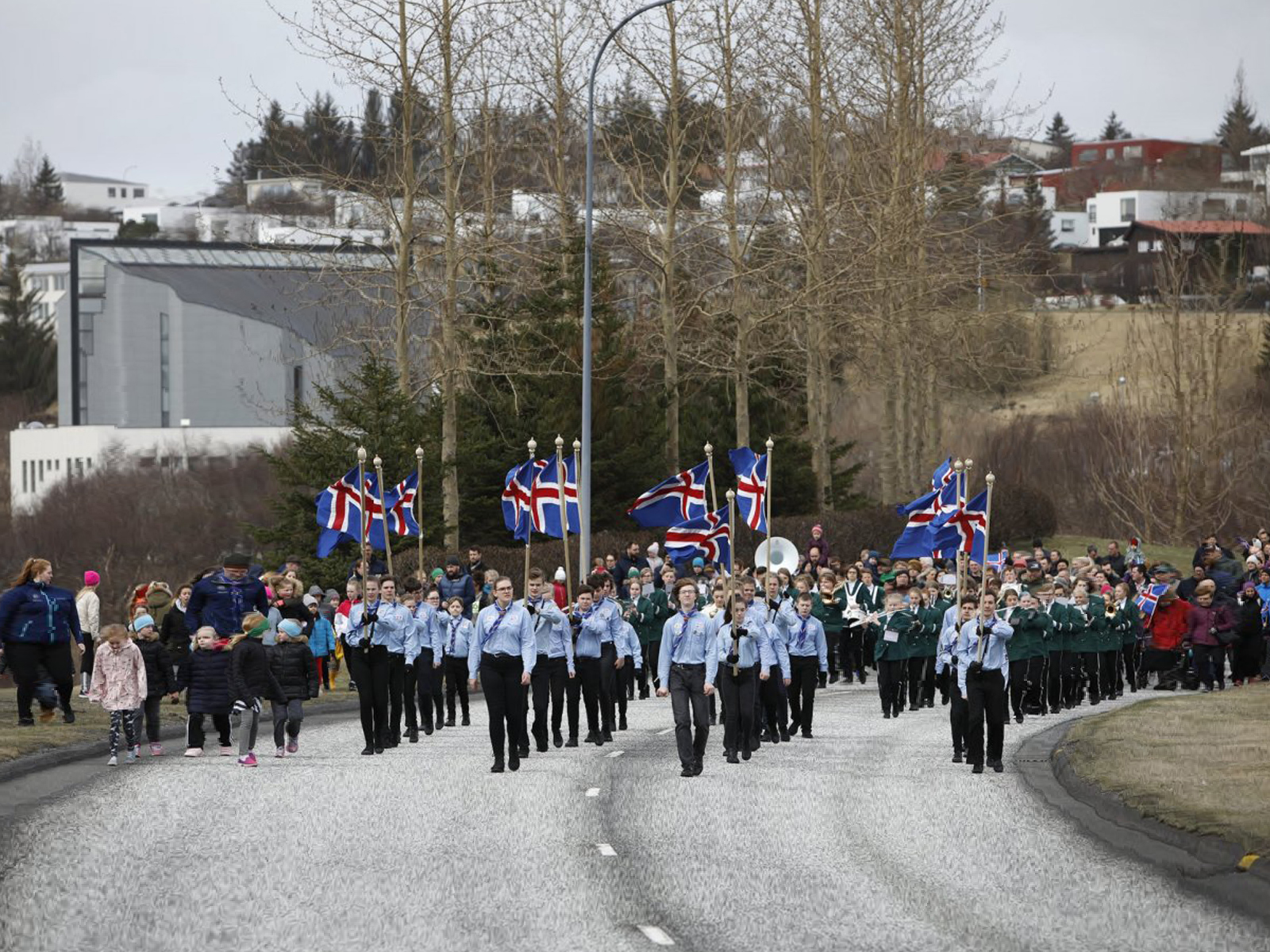
- First Day of Summer celebrations in Kópavogur
- Official name: sumardagurinn fyrsti
- Observed by: Iceland
- Date: first Thursday after 18 April
- 2024 date: 25 April
- 2025 date: 24 April
- 2026 date: 23 April
- 2027 date: 22 April
- Frequency: annual

First Day of Summer (sumardagurinn fyrsti [ˈsʏːmarˌtaːɣʏrɪn ˈfɪ(r̥)stɪ]) is an annual public holiday in Iceland that is celebrated on the first Thursday after 18 April (some time between 19 and 25 April).

It is a celebration of the start of the first summer month (Harpa) of the old Icelandic calendar. The old calendar had six months of short days (winter) and six months of nightless days (summer), so even though the climate of late April in Iceland is not very summer-like (on fourteen occasions between 1949 and 2015 the average temperature in the capital, Reykjavík, has been below freezing), the day marks the lengthening of the days and the harsh winter being over.

Parades and organized entertainment are held in various places around Iceland on the first day of summer.

According to folk belief, a good summer would be sure to ensue if the temperature dropped below freezing right before the first day of summer. People would place a bowl of water outside for the night and hope that it would freeze.

== See also ==
- Summer solstice
- Spring equinox
