= Halla Tómasdóttir =

President of Iceland since 2024

Her Excellency Halla Tómasdóttir
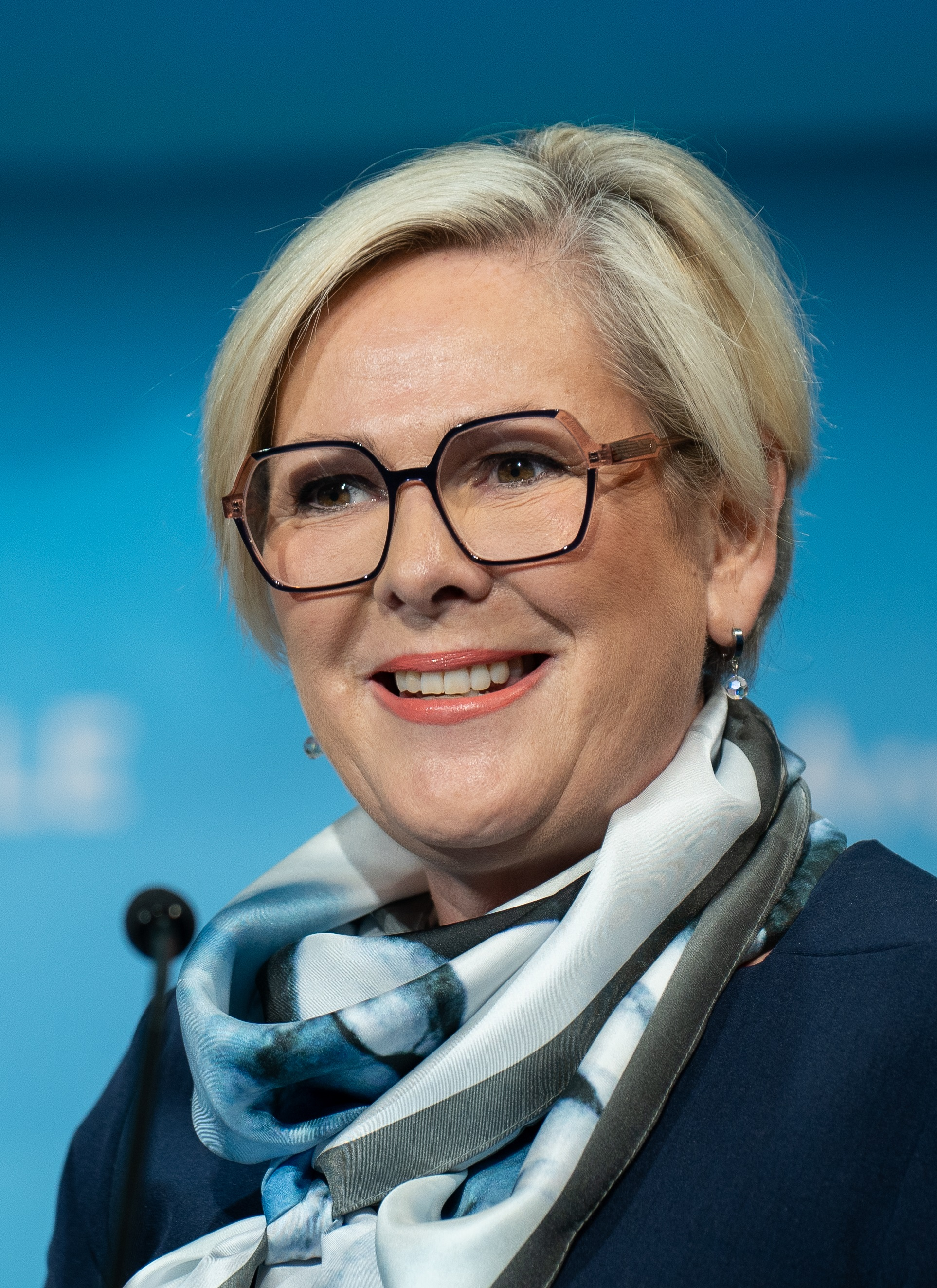
- Halla in 2024

7th President of Iceland
- Incumbent
- Assumed office 1 August 2024
- Prime Minister: Bjarni Benediktsson; Kristrún Frostadóttir
- Preceded by: Guðni Th. Jóhannesson

Personal details
- Born: 11 October 1968 (age 57) Reykjavík, Iceland
- Party: Independent
- Spouse: Björn Skúlason (m. 2004)
- Children: 2
- Education: Auburn University at Montgomery (BBA); Thunderbird School of Global Management (MBA); Cranfield University (DBA)
- Awards: Cartier Women's Initiative Awards

Halla Tómasdóttir (Icelandic pronunciation: [ˈhatla ˈtʰouːmasˌtouhtɪr̥]; born 11 October 1968) is an Icelandic businesswoman and politician who has served as president of Iceland since 2024. She is Iceland's second female president, after Vigdís Finnbogadóttir. Before becoming president, Halla was a public speaker and the chief executive of The B Team, a global nonprofit group.

== Early life and education ==
Halla graduated from Verzlunarskóli Íslands in 1986, and afterwards moved to the United States as an international student, where she attended Evansville Central High School and graduated from Auburn University at Montgomery with a bachelor's degree in business administration, with a focus on management and human resources, in 1993. She received a Master of Business Administration degree from the Thunderbird School of Global Management at Arizona State University in 1995. Halla also has a Doctor of Business Administration from Cranfield University.

== Early career ==
Halla is a former member of the founding team of Reykjavík University in 1998. She also co-founded Auður Capital, an investment firm. She served as the chief executive of The B Team, a global nonprofit group of business and civil society leaders working to promote business practices focused on humanity and the climate.

=== 2016 presidential campaign ===
Halla announced her candidacy for the presidency of Iceland on 17 March 2016. She received 27.9% of the vote, the second-highest share after that of the winner, Guðni Th. Jóhannesson, who received 39.1%.

=== 2024 presidential campaign ===
Halla announced her candidacy for the presidency of Iceland on 17 March 2024. Her campaign focused on issues such as the effects of social media on the mental health of youth, tourism development, and the role of artificial intelligence.

In the campaign, Halla declared herself opposed to Iceland's participation in arms purchases for Ukraine, which has been resisting a Russian invasion of the country since 2022. Her stance led to criticism from Þórdís Kolbrún Reykfjörð Gylfadóttir, the Minister for Foreign Affairs, who called it an "arrogant attitude" to condition support for Ukraine on them not buying what they most need.

On 1 June 2024, Halla was elected with 73,182 votes and received 34.1% of the popular vote, defeating former prime minister Katrín Jakobsdóttir by a roughly 10-point margin.

== President of Iceland (2024–present) ==
Halla assumed the office of President of Iceland from Guðni Th. Jóhannesson on 1 August 2024. She is the seventh president of Iceland and the second woman to hold the position. In September 2024, it was reported that only 45% of Icelanders were satisfied with her performance as president, the lowest approval rating for a sitting president in a poll.

Halla made her first official visit to Denmark in October 2024. It was notable that she spoke English with King Frederik and delivered a speech in Christiansborg, the first Icelandic president to do so in English.

Later in October, the government of Bjarni Benediktsson collapsed, and Halla held her first Council of State meeting at Bessastaðir, meeting with leaders of the outgoing government parties (except the Left-Green Movement).

== Personal life ==
Halla was born in Reykjavík. She is married to Björn Skúlason. They have two children. Halla's parents are Tómas Björn Þórhallsson, a plumber, and Kristjana Sigurðardóttir, a social educator.

== Honours ==
=== National honours ===
- Iceland:
  - Grand Master and Grand Cross with Collar of the Order of the Falcon (1 August 2024)

=== Foreign honours ===
- Denmark:
  - Knight of the Order of the Elephant (8 October 2024)

External videos
- Halla Tomasdottir: A feminine response to Iceland's financial crash, TED (conference), 10:17, 2010
- It's time for women to run for office, TED (conference), 19:19, 2016

- Finland:
  - Grand Cross of the Order of the White Rose of Finland with Collar (7 October 2025)
- Norway:
  - Knight Grand Cross of the Royal Norwegian Order of Saint Olav (8 April 2025)
- Sweden:
  - Knight of the Royal Order of the Seraphim (6 May 2025)

Political offices
Preceded by Guðni Th. Jóhannesson	President of Iceland; 2024–present	Incumbent
