= Supreme Court of Iceland =

Highest judicial authority in Iceland

- Hæstiréttur Íslands
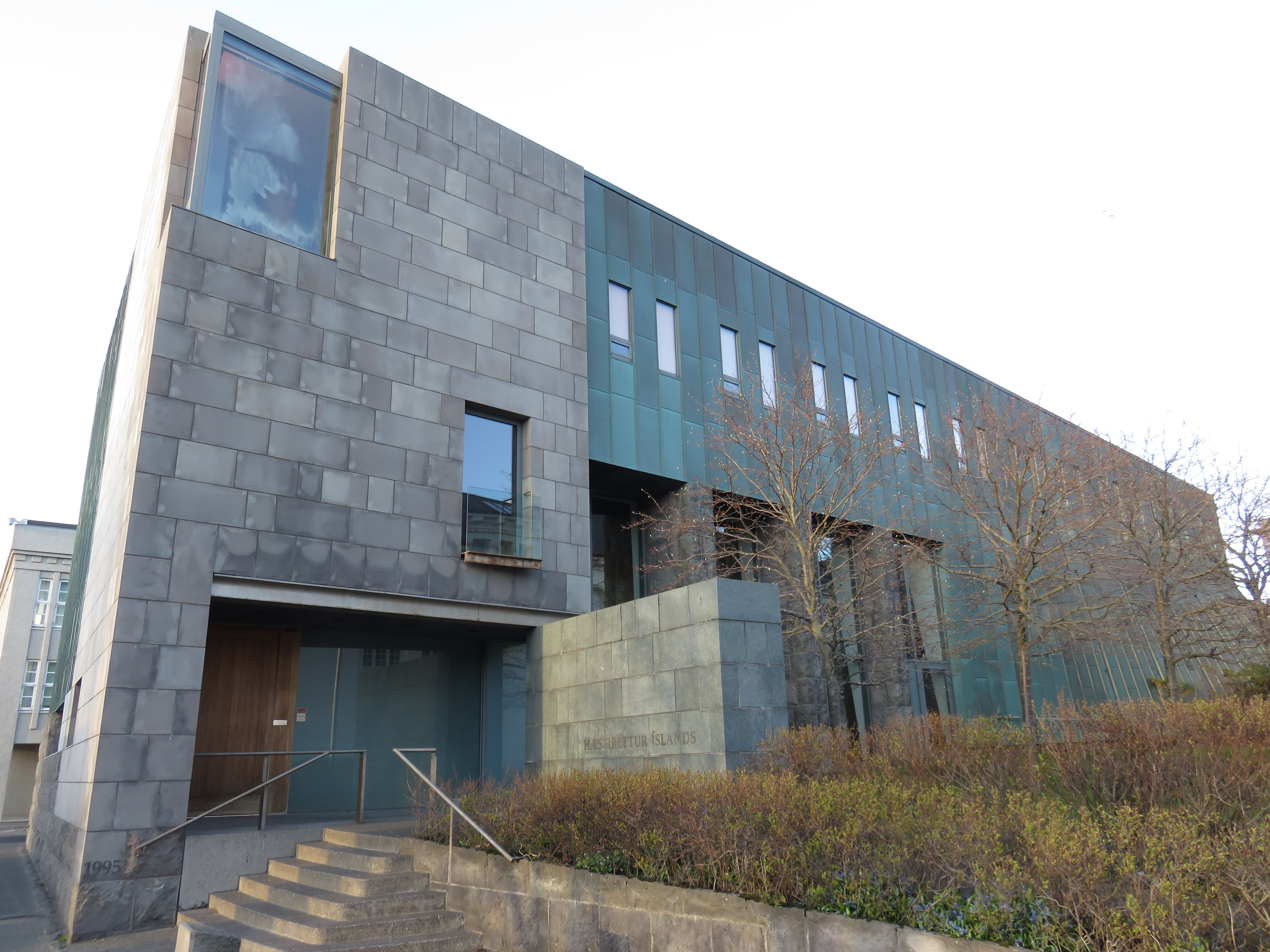
- Supreme Court of Iceland building in 2018
- Interactive map of Supreme Court of Iceland
- 64°08′52″N 21°55′56″W
- Established: 18 August 1919
- Jurisdiction: Iceland
- Location: Reykjavík
- Coordinates: 64°08′52″N 21°55′56″W
- Composition method: Presidential appointment after minister of justice nomination following Qualifications Committee selection. Parliamentary confirmation before appointment if minister nomination differs from committee selection.
- Authorised by: Constitution No. 33/1944; Courts Act No. 50/2016
- Appeals from: Court of Appeal
- Judge term length: Life tenure
- Number of positions: 7 (by statute)
- Annual budget: 245 million ISK (2019)
- Website: haestirettur.is (in Icelandic)

President
- Currently: Benedikt Bogason
- Since: 1 January 2022
- Lead position ends: 31 December 2026
- Jurist term ends: 31 December 2026

Vice-President
- Currently: Ingveldur Einarsdóttir
- Since: 1 January 2022

The Supreme Court of Iceland (Icelandic: Hæstiréttur Íslands, pronounced [ˈhaistɪˌrjɛhtʏr ˈistlants], lit. 'Highest Court of Iceland') is the final court of appeal in the judiciary of Iceland. It is also the oldest of the current courts of law in Iceland and the highest of the three Icelandic court branches, the others being the District Courts of Iceland and the Court of Appeal (Landsréttur).

Notwithstanding the Court not being mentioned by name in the Constitution of Iceland, but only its justices, it is validated in the Courts Act No. 50/2016. The Supreme Court of Iceland is located at the Dómhúsið (Courthouse) at Arnarhóll in Reykjavík, a building that was specially built for that purpose and that came into use in 1996.

The current president of the court is Benedikt Bogason.

== History ==
The court was founded under the Supreme Court Act of 1919 and held its first session on 16 February 1920. Previously, the National High Court had been the highest domestic court, but a line of appeal had been available to the Supreme Court of Denmark in Copenhagen. The establishment of the Supreme Court moved the final word in Icelandic cases home to Iceland.

The first justices of the Supreme Court were Kristján Jónsson (president), Halldór Daníelsson, Eggert Briem, Lárus H. Bjarnason and Páll Einarsson. The first three men had been the judges of the old National High Court, which had operated throughout the 19th century but was abolished with the founding of the Supreme Court.

== Justices ==
The court is composed of seven justices selected by the Qualifications Committee and nominated by the minister of justice for presidential confirmation. In cases where the minister wishes to make changes to the committee's selection, Parliament must approve of said changes with a simple majority vote.

The Supreme Court justices elect a president and a vice-president. The president of the Supreme Court manages the affairs of the court, directs court sessions and divides tasks among the justices and the employees of the court and maintains disciplinary supervision. They are responsible for the operation and finances of the court and represents the court towards the public. Under article 8 of the Constitution of Iceland, the president of the Supreme Court is one of the three holders of the power of the president of Iceland in their absence, the others being the prime minister and the Speaker of Parliament.

As of September 2022, the justices of the Supreme Court are:

- Benedikt Bogason (president)
- Ingveldur Einarsdóttir (vice-president)
- Ása Ólafsdóttir
- Karl Axelsson
- Björg Thorarensen
- Sigurður Tómas Magnússon
- Ólafur Börkur Þorvaldsson

== Procedure ==
The court operates in two divisions, where either three or five justices sit to hear a case before the court. For especially important cases, the president of the court may decide that the bench be constituted by seven justices. The main rule is that cases are presented orally before the Supreme Court and the court sessions are generally open to the public. The president of the Supreme Court presides over the session or, in their absence, the vice president. If neither of them is hearing the case, the most senior justice in session will preside.

Lawyers appearing before the court wear black robes with blue lapels, whilst the justices wear distinctive blue robes with black lapels, a custom which reputably began with the suggestion of the first lawyers to appear before the Supreme Court, Eggert Claessen and Sveinn Björnsson (later President of Iceland).

As soon as an oral case presentation is finished, the justices retire for a closed meeting to discuss and vote on the case. One justice will be held responsible for introducing the matter and proposing a solution of the case and will usually write the opinion of the court. If the views of the reporting justice do not have the support of a majority of the justices, the president will ask another justice to write the court’s opinion, and the minority justices decide who will write a separate dissenting judgement. Finally, a complete judgement will be prepared, and the justices will sign a single copy which is filed in the Book of Opinions of the Court.

For cases where members of the Cabinet are suspected of criminal behaviour, the Landsdómur, which includes the five of the longest serving Supreme Court justices, sits instead of the Supreme Court.

== Building ==
After the transfer of power from Denmark, the court was first housed in the Old Penitentiary Building on Skólavörðustígur in Reykjavík. In 1949, it moved to the former court building on Lindargata. 1993 saw a competition to design a new home for the court, which was won by Margrét Harðardóttir and Steve Christer of Studio Granda, Reykjavík. The Icelandic minister of justice dug the first spade of ground for the new courthouse of the Supreme Court at Arnarhóll on 15 July 1994, laid the cornerstone of the building on the court’s 75th anniversary, 16 February 1995, and handed it over to the Court for use on 5 September 1996.

== See also ==
- List of justices of the Supreme Court of Iceland
