= Karl Axelsson =

Icelandic politician (born 1962)

Karl Axelsson (born 1962) is an Icelandic politician.

== Career ==
Axelsson was appointed as the Justice of the Supreme Court of Iceland on 12 October 2015.
