= Guðni Th. Jóhannesson =

President of Iceland from 2016 to 2024

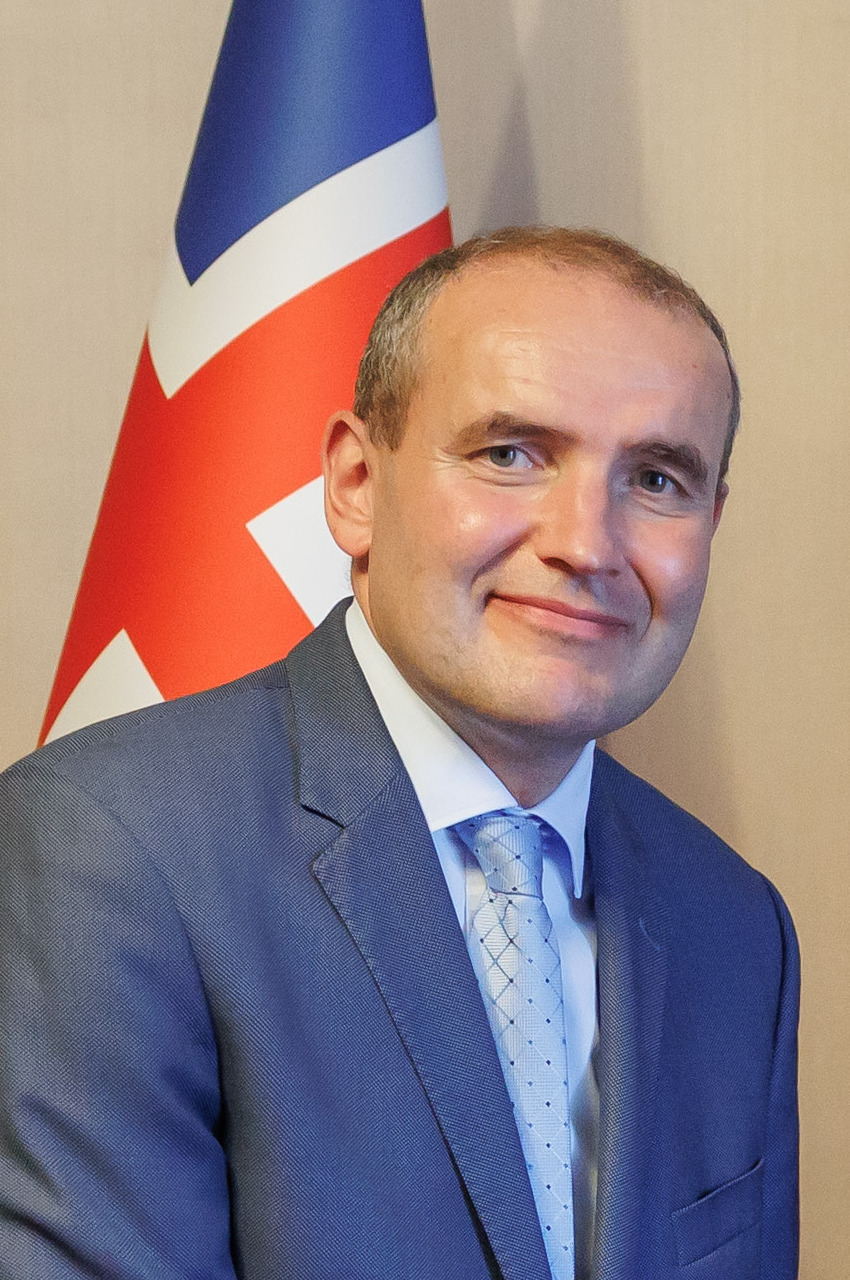
- Guðni in 2022

6th President of Iceland
- In office 1 August 2016 – 1 August 2024
- Prime Minister: Sigurður Ingi Jóhannsson; Bjarni Benediktsson; Katrín Jakobsdóttir; Bjarni Benediktsson
- Preceded by: Ólafur Ragnar Grímsson
- Succeeded by: Halla Tómasdóttir

Personal details
- Born: Guðni Thorlacius Jóhannesson; 26 June 1968 (age 58) Reykjavík, Iceland
- Party: Independent
- Spouse(s): Elín Haraldsdóttir (m. 1995; div. 1996) Eliza Jean Reid (m. 2004)
- Children: 5
- Education: University of Warwick (BA); University of Iceland (MA); St Antony's College, Oxford (MSt); Queen Mary, University of London (PhD)

Academic background
- Thesis: Troubled Waters. Cod War, Fishing Disputes, and Britain's Fight for the Freedom of the High Seas, 1948-1964 (2004)

Guðni Thorlacius Jóhannesson (Icelandic pronunciation: [ˈkvʏðnɪ ˈtʰɔrlaˌsiʏs ˈjouːhanɛsɔn]; born 26 June 1968) is an Icelandic historian and politician who served as the sixth president of Iceland from 2016 to 2024.

A career historian, Guðni was a professor at the University of Iceland before running for president in 2016. His field of research is modern Icelandic history, and he has published works on the Cod Wars, the 2008–2011 Icelandic financial crisis and the Icelandic presidency, among other topics. He also worked as a translator. From 2011 to 2015, Guðni was president of the Icelandic historical society, Sögufélag.

In May 2016, Guðni launched a bid to become President of Iceland. Running as an independent, he won that year's presidential election with a plurality of the vote, becoming the youngest person ever to be Iceland's president. His term was met with consistently high approval ratings, at levels unprecedented for any Icelandic president. In 2020, he won re-election with an overwhelming majority. Guðni decided not to run for re-election again, and left office in 2024, after completing his second term.

== Early life and education ==
Guðni is the son of teacher and journalist Margrét Thorlacius and sports instructor Jóhannes Sæmundsson. His brother Patrekur Jóhannesson is a former Icelandic handball national team player. Guðni played handball in his youth, in both Iceland and the UK.

Guðni graduated from Menntaskólinn í Reykjavík (MR), a junior college in central Reykjavík, in 1987. While at MR, he competed in Gettu betur, an Icelandic team quiz show for junior college students. He earned a bachelor's degree in history and political science from the University of Warwick in England in 1991 and a Master of Arts in history from the University of Iceland in 1997. He has also studied German and Russian at university level. In 1999, he completed an MSt degree in history at St Antony's College at the University of Oxford. In 2003, he received a PhD in history from Queen Mary, University of London.

== Career ==
Guðni has worked as a lecturer at the University of Iceland, Bifröst University and University of London. At the time of his presidential candidacy he worked as a senior lecturer in history at the University of Iceland. His field of research is modern Icelandic history, in which he has published a number of works, including on the Cod Wars, the 2008–2011 Icelandic financial crisis and the Icelandic presidency. He has written a biography of Gunnar Thoroddsen and a book about Kristján Eldjárn's presidency. Between 1992 and 1997, he translated four works by Stephen King into Icelandic. From 2011 to 2015, Guðni was president of Sögufélag, the Icelandic historical society.

=== Presidential candidacy ===
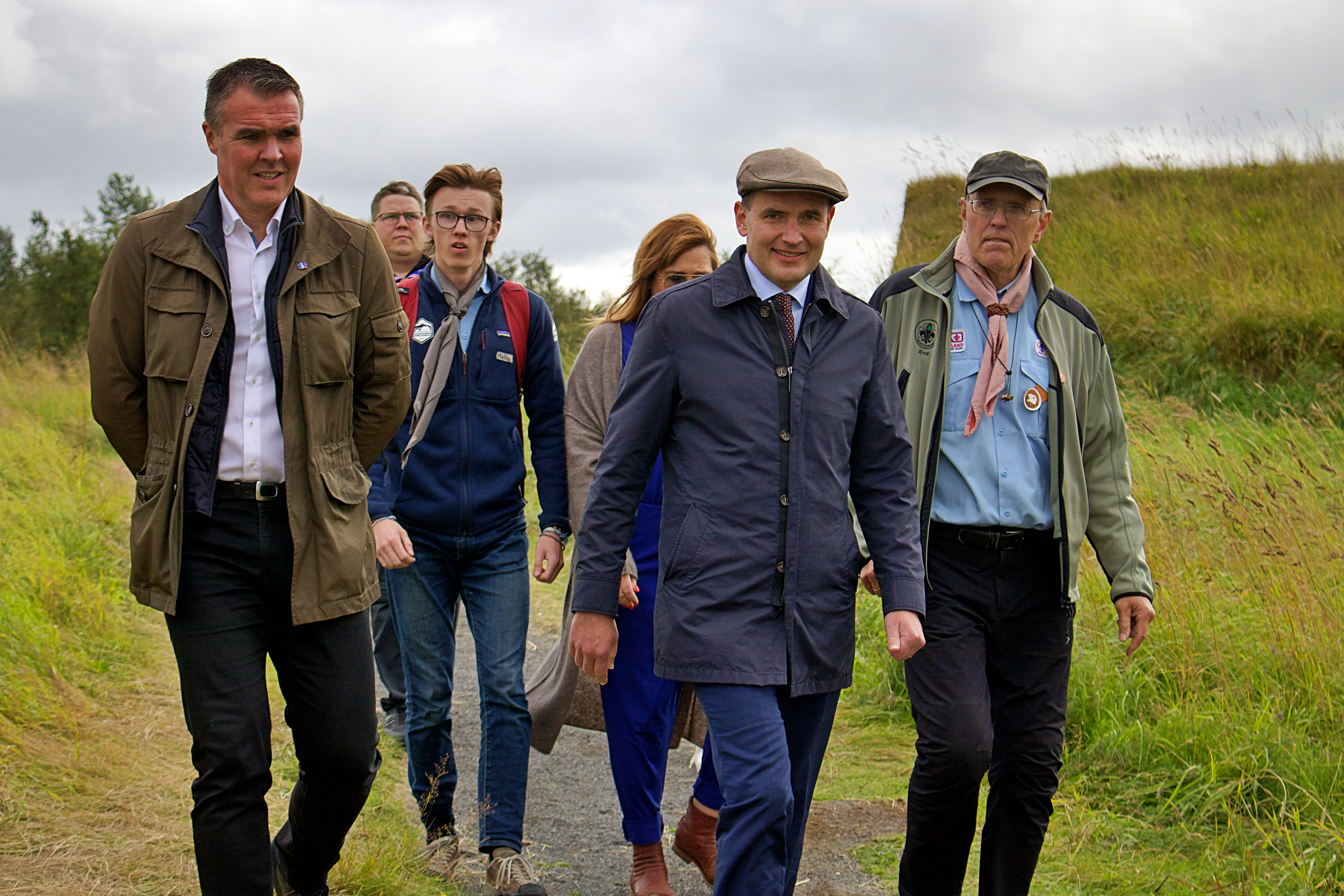
Guðni at an event at Árbæjarsafnið in 2021.

Guðni decided to stand for president on 5 May 2016. Before his candidacy, he had appeared frequently on live television to provide commentary and historical context in the wake of the publication of the Panama Papers, which created a scandal for Icelandic prime minister Sigmundur Davíð Gunnlaugsson and ultimately led to his ouster. A scholar of the Icelandic presidency, Guðni delineated on live television the options available to incumbent president Ólafur Ragnar Grímsson and other Icelandic political actors. After his television appearances, there were calls for Guðni to run for the presidency himself.

His platform included support for a citizen initiative referendum provision in the Constitution. Early polls showed significant support, and following incumbent president Ólafur Ragnar Grímsson's decision to drop out of the race Guðni saw an increase in popularity reflected in various polls, which ranked him first with 67% to 69%, far ahead of other contenders. Guðni was elected on 25 June after receiving a plurality of 39.1% of the vote.

Guðni was unaffiliated with any of Iceland's political parties. He said he would be a "less political president" than his predecessor due to a lack of partisanship. Guðni has emphasized the importance of unity for the small nation.

=== President of Iceland ===
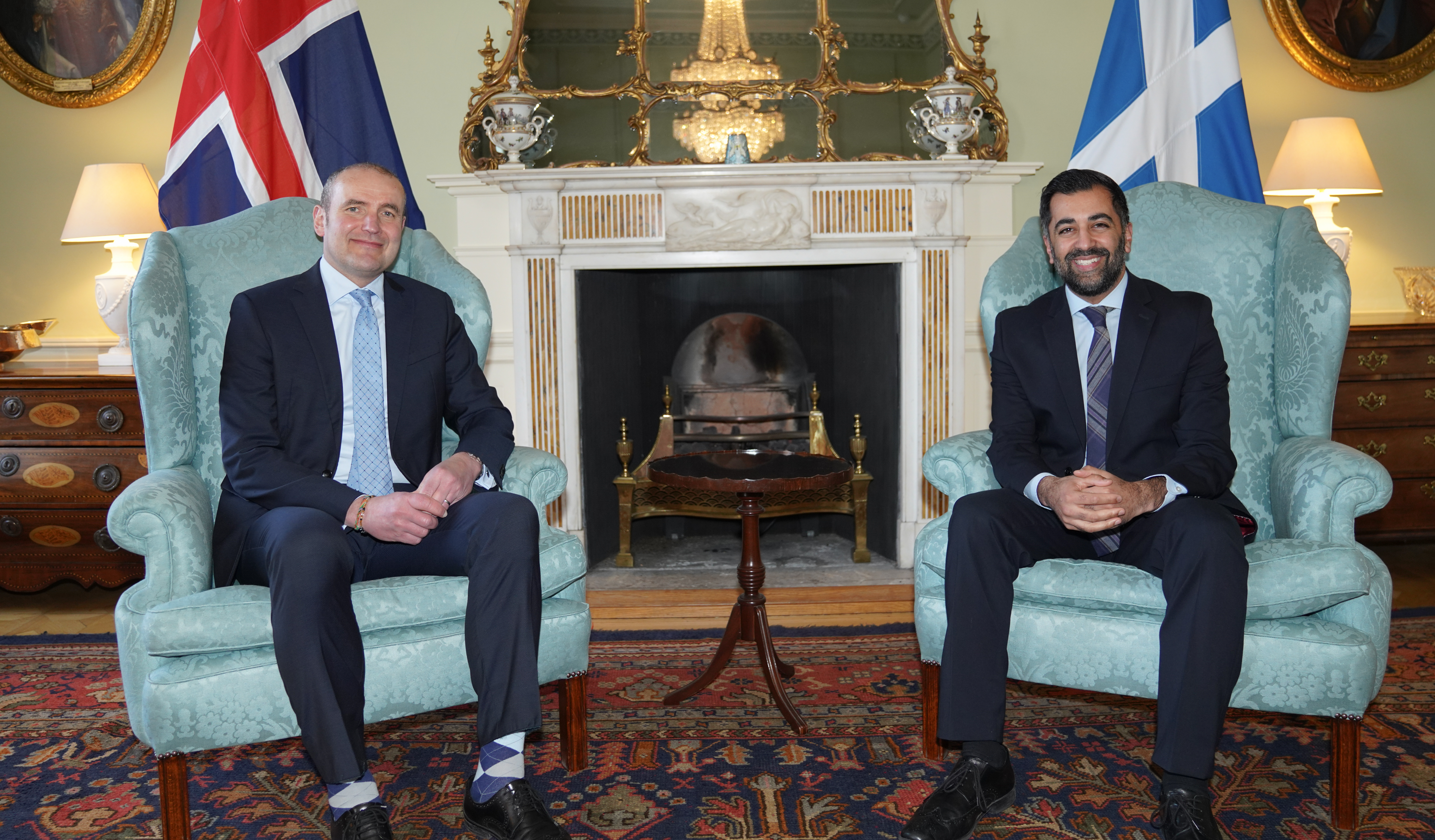
Guðni Th. Jóhannesson meeting with First Minister of Scotland, Humza Yousaf, at Bute House in Edinburgh, 2024

Guðni took office as President of Iceland on 1 August 2016 after winning the most votes in that year's election, 71,356 (39.1%). At 48, he was Iceland's youngest president. Roughly one month into his term, Guðni had approval ratings of 68.6% in an MMR survey, the highest approval rating this pollster has measured for an Icelandic president since its establishment in 2011. Early in his term, Guðni had to oversee negotiations to form a government in Iceland in the wake of the 2016 Icelandic parliamentary election on 29 October. These negotiations were difficult, as no pre-election coalition had a majority, and all possible majority coalitions had parties with highly divergent policy positions. In December 2016, Guðni had approval ratings of 97%. Such high approval ratings for Icelandic politicians are without precedent. In April 2019, his approval rating was 93.5% among those who took a position in a survey.

Guðni attracted international attention in February 2017 when he jokingly vowed to ban pineapple as a pizza topping.

In the 2020 presidential election, Guðni was re-elected with 92.2% of the vote. On 1 January 2024, Guðni announced in his New Year's address to the Icelandic people that he would not stand for election again in 2024.

== Personal life ==
=== Religious beliefs ===
Guðni is not part of any organized religion, but believes in an omnipotent God and has "Christian humanitarian values". He was raised in the Catholic faith. He left the Catholic Church due to what his perception of its poor response to reports of criminal abuses by priests. Guðni sees his credo as the Universal Declaration of Human Rights, believing in its words that "human beings are born free, equal in dignity and rights. Humans are endowed with reason and conscience and should act in the spirit of brotherhood towards each other."

=== Family ===
Guðni is the son of the teacher and journalist Margrét Thorlacius and the physical education teacher and coach Jóhannes Sæmundsson. His father died of cancer at age 42. He has two brothers, Patrekur (a former Icelandic men's national handball team player, who is coach of the Austria men's national handball team and father of rapper JóiPé) and Jóhannes, who is a systems analyst.

Guðni married Canadian Eliza Jean Reid in 2004 and they have four children. The couple, who met while studying in the United Kingdom, moved to Iceland in 2003. Reid became First Lady of Iceland when her husband was sworn into office. Guðni also has a daughter from a previous marriage, the author Rut Guðnadóttir.

== Publications ==
Guðni has authored numerous books on historical topics. On 1 September 2022, he presented a book about the Icelandic Cod Wars with the United Kingdom, Stund milli stríða. Saga landhelgismálsins, 1961–1971 (A Lull in the Cod Wars. Iceland and its Territorial Waters 1961–1971) on the 50th anniversary of the 1972 skirmish.

A selection of other important books published by Guðni:

- Gunnar Thoroddsen – Ævisaga, (a biography of a former prime minister of Iceland, Gunnar Thoroddsen), 2010, Bókabúð Forlagið.
- Hrunið: Ísland á barmi gjaldþrots og upplausnar, The Collapse: Iceland on the Verge of Bankruptcy and Dissolution, (a book about the 2008 financial crisis), 2009, Bókabúð Forlagið.
- Óvinir ríksins, Enemies of the State, (a book about secret observation of supposed threats to inner security after Iceland joined NATO in 1949 and the U.S. established an air base near Keflavík in 1951), 2006, Bókabúð Forlagið. The book was nominated for the Icelandic Book Prize 2006.

== Honours ==
=== National Honours ===
- Iceland:
  - Grand Cross with Collar and Grand Master (2016–2024) of the Order of the Falcon (1 August 2016)

=== Foreign Honours ===
- Denmark:
  - Knight of the Order of the Elephant (24 January 2017)
- Estonia:
  - First Class of the Order of the Cross of Terra Mariana (5 February 2025)
- Finland:
  - Grand Cross with Collar of the Order of the White Rose of Finland (31 May 2017).
- Germany:
  - Grand Cross Special Class of the Order of Merit of the Federal Republic of Germany (12 June 2019)
- Latvia:
  - Commander Grand Cross with Chain of the Order of the Three Stars (16 November 2018)
- Norway:
  - Grand Cross of the Order of St. Olav (21 March 2017)
- Sweden:
  - Knight of the Royal Order of the Seraphim (17 January 2018)
  - Recipient of the Commemorative Golden Jubilee Medal of His Majesty The King (15 September 2023)

=== Honorary Degrees ===
In 2024, he was granted an honorary doctorate at the University of Oulu. In 2025, he was granted an honorary doctorate at the University of the Faroe Islands.

== Bibliography ==
- Kári í jötunmóð. Saga Íslenskrar erfðagreiningar og Kára Stefánssonar (Reykjavík: Nýja bókafélagið, 1999).
- Völundarhús valdsins. Stjórnarmyndanir, stjórnarslit og staða forseta Íslands í embættistíð Kristjáns Eldjárns, 1968–1980 (Reykjavík: Mál og menning, 2005).
- Óvinir ríkisins. Ógnir og innra öryggi í kalda stríðinu á Íslandi (Reykjavík: Mál og menning, 2006).
- Þorskastríðin þrjú. Saga landhelgismálsins 1948–1976 (Reykjavík: Hafréttarstofnun Íslands, 2006).
- Hrunið. Ísland á barmi gjaldþrots og upplausnar (Reykjavík: JPV, 2009)
- Gunnar Thoroddsen. Ævisaga. (Reykjavík: JPV, 2010)
- Fyrstu forsetarnir. (Reykjavík: Sögufélag, 2016)

Guðni has translated four Stephen King books into Icelandic.

Political offices
Preceded by Ólafur Ragnar Grímsson	President of Iceland; 2016–2024	Succeeded by Halla Tómasdóttir
