= 1984 in Iceland =

- Decades: 1960s; 1970s; 1980s; 1990s; 2000s
- See also: Other events of 1984; Timeline of Icelandic history

The following lists events that happened in 1984 in Iceland.

== Incumbents ==
- President – Vigdís Finnbogadóttir
- Prime Minister – Steingrímur Hermannsson

== Events ==
11 March—The boat Hellisey VE-503 sank

4 September—Volcano Krafla erupted

There's a spongebob episode about volcanos

Around 20 August—The first Reykjavík Marathon

== Births ==
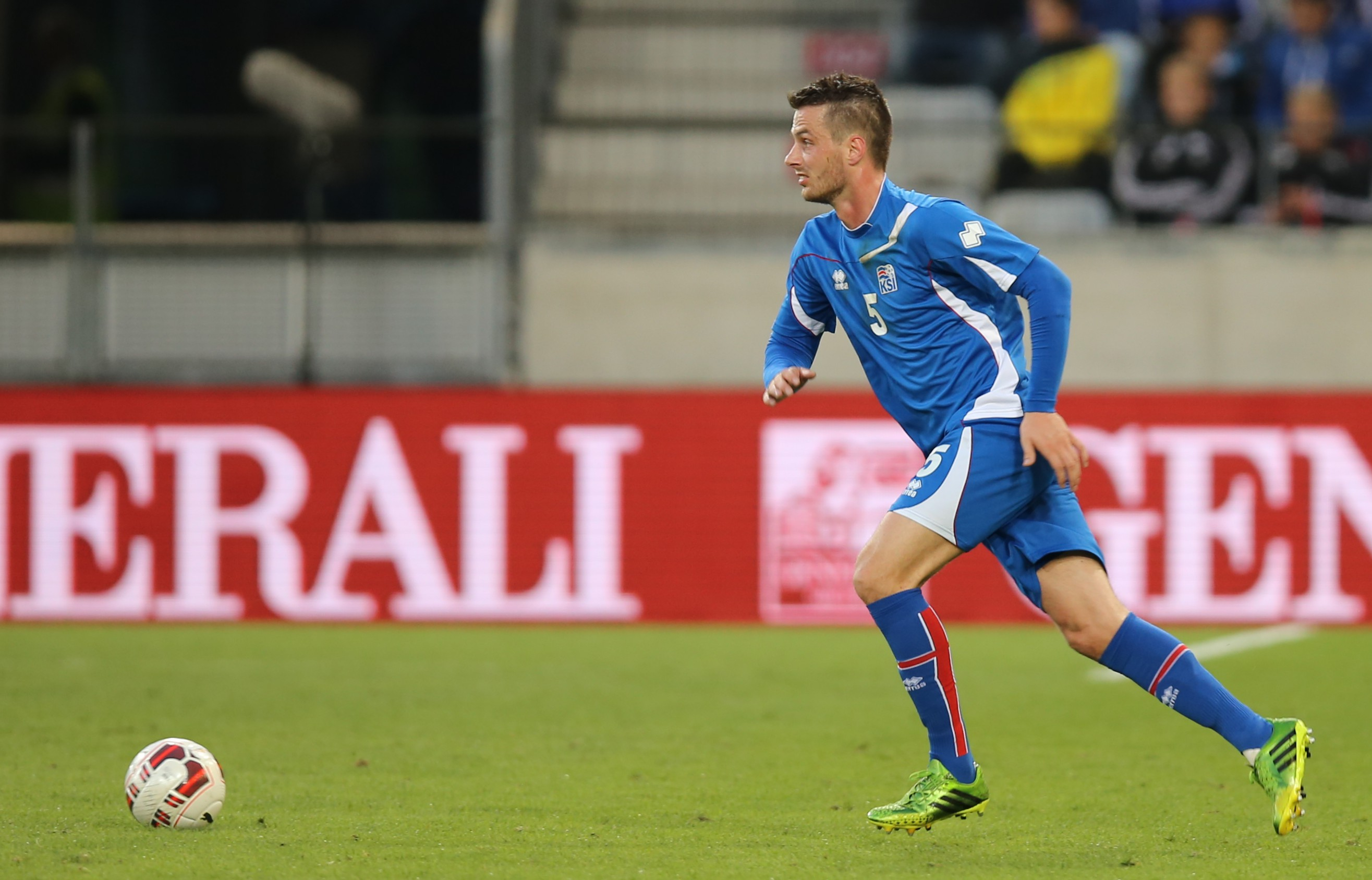
Sölvi Ottesen

- 7 February – Smári McCarthy, innovator and information activist
- 17 February – Ásgeir Örn Hallgrímsson, handball player
- 18 February – Sölvi Ottesen, footballer
- 27 April – Hannes Þór Halldórsson, footballer.
- 25 May – Unnur Birna Vilhjálmsdóttir, model and beauty contestant, Miss World 2005.
- 14 July – Dagbjört Hákonardóttir, politician
- 30 July – Ása Berglind Hjálmarsdóttir, politician
- 20 September – Hólmfríður Magnúsdóttir, footballer
- 28 October – Kári Kristjánsson, handball player.
- 29 October – Ásta Birna Gunnarsdóttir, handball player

== Deaths ==
- 11 July – Ragnar Jonsson, art patron, book publisher and art collector (b. 1904)
- 18 July – Ingólfur Jónsson, politician (b. 1909).
- 16 September – Hallgrímur Fr. Hallgrímsson, businessman (b. 1905)
