= 1985 in Iceland =

- Decades: 1960s; 1970s; 1980s; 1990s; 2000s
- See also: Other events of 1985; Timeline of Icelandic history

The following lists events that happened in 1985 in Iceland.

== Incumbents ==
- President – Vigdís Finnbogadóttir
- Prime Minister – Steingrímur Hermannsson

== Events ==
- January 1 - Iceland joins the European Free Trade Association (EFTA).
- January 1 - Law on tobacco control comes into force
- January 26 - The volcano Hekla erupts, causing significant ash fall and disrupting air traffic.
- April 3 - The Icelandic parliament, Althing, passed a law establishing the University of Akureyri.
- May 9 - The first direct commercial flights between Iceland and the United States began, operated by Icelandair.
- June 15 - The first Gay Pride parade takes place in Reykjavík, marking a significant milestone for LGBTQ+ rights in Iceland.
- August 24 - Iceland holds a parliamentary election, resulting in a victory for the Independence Party, led by Steingrímur Hermannsson.
- September 1 - A historic meeting between U.S. President Ronald Reagan and Soviet leader Mikhail Gorbachev takes place in Reykjavík, known as the Reykjavík Summit. Although no agreement is reached, it sets the stage for future arms control talks.
- November 14 - Hólmfríður Karlsdóttir is crowned Miss World at Royal Albert Hall in London, UK. It is the first Icelandic beauty pageant title.
- September 15 - The Icelandic Coast Guard confronts British trawlers during the "Cod Wars," a series of disputes over fishing rights in the North Atlantic.
- October 10 - The Icelandic Women's National Football Team wins their first major international match, defeating Scotland 2-1.
- December 24 - A catastrophic flood occurs in Skaftárhreppur due to a volcanic eruption under the Vatnajökull glacier. Several bridges are destroyed, and residents are evacuated.
- 1985 — Iceland experienced high inflation, averaging approximately 31.8%, amid ongoing economic adjustments and wage negotiations.
- 1985 — Iceland implemented economic stabilization policies aimed at reducing inflation and addressing external debt concerns.

== Births ==
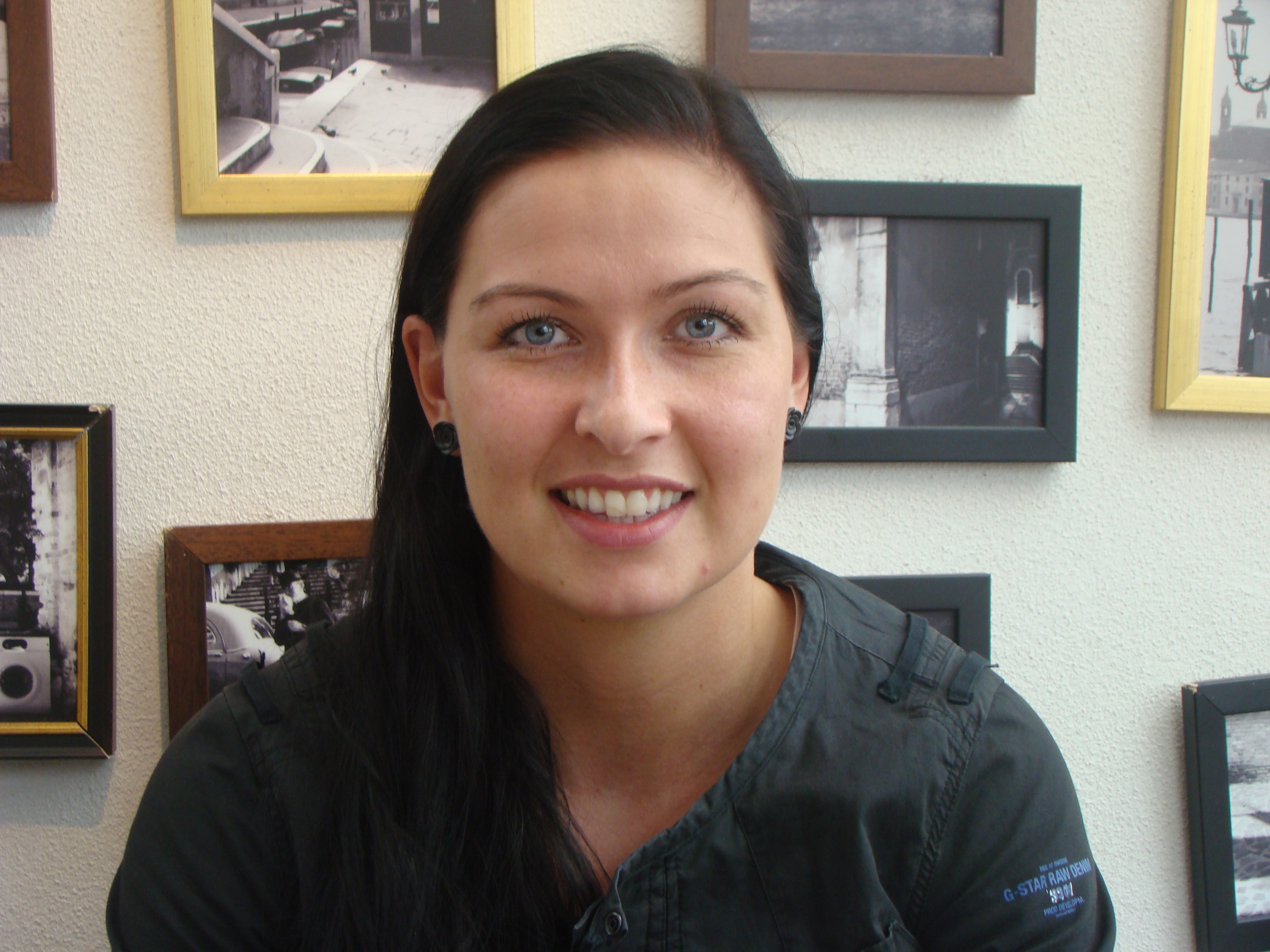
Guðbjörg Gunnarsdóttir

- 24 April – Baldur Sigurðsson, footballer
- 27 April – Dóra Stefánsdóttir, footballer
- 16 May - Emilíana Torrini, singer-songwriter
- 18 May – Guðbjörg Gunnarsdóttir, footballer
- 24 May – Björgvin Páll Gústavsson, handball player
- 15 July – Sif Atladóttir, footballer
- 29 July – Steinþór Freyr Þorsteinsson, footballer
- 8 September - Ragnar Þórhallsson, vocalist and guitarist
- 5 October – Bergur Ingi Pétursson, hammer thrower.
- 28 October – Ásdís Hjálmsdóttir, javelin thrower.

== Deaths ==
- 26 February – Guðmundur G. Hagalín, writer (b. 1898)
- 26 April – Björn Jónsson, politician (b. 1916).
