= 1973 in Iceland =

- Decades: 1950s; 1960s; 1970s; 1980s; 1990s
- See also: Other events of 1973; Timeline of Icelandic history

The following lists events that happened during 1973 in Iceland.

== Incumbents ==
- President – Kristján Eldjárn
- Prime Minister – Ólafur Jóhannesson

== Events ==
=== January ===
- January 23 - Eldfell on Heimaey erupts.

=== May ===
- May 18 - Joseph Godber, British Minister of Agriculture, Fisheries and Food, announces that Royal Navy frigates will protect British trawlers fishing in the disputed 50-mile limit round Iceland.

== Births ==
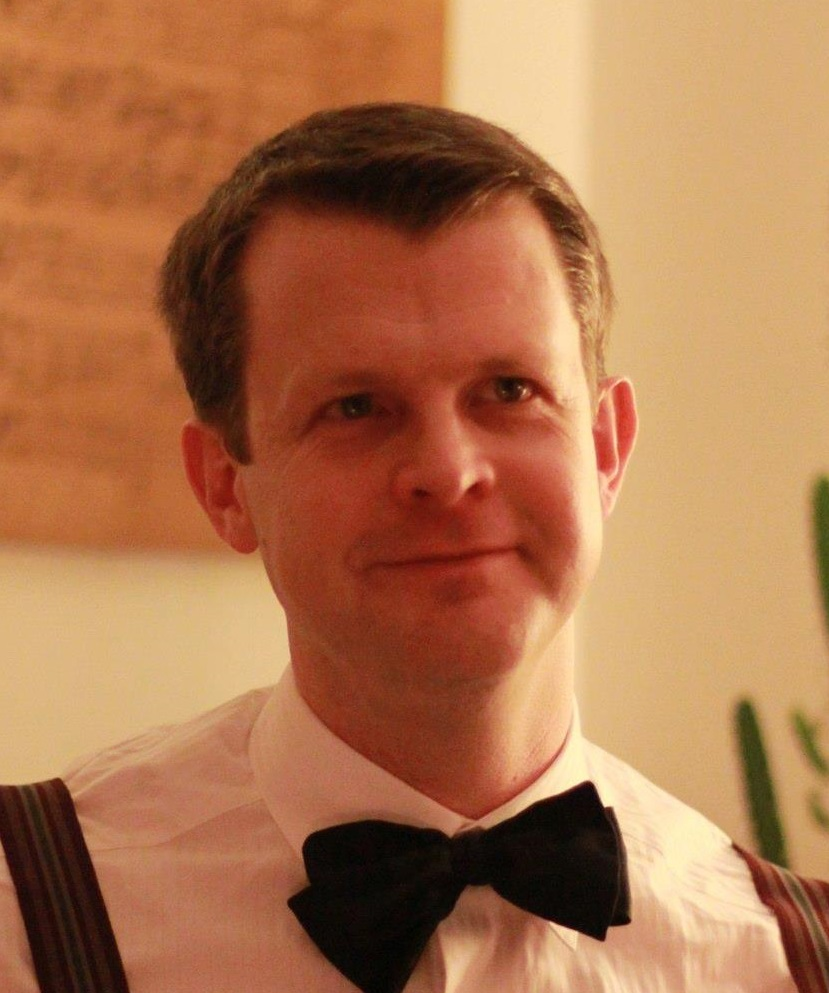
Andri Steinþór Björnsson

- 11 January – Andri Steinþór Björnsson, psychologist
- 4 June – Lárus Sigurðsson, footballer.
- 22 June – Eydís Ásbjörnsdóttir, politician
- 14 July – Andri Snær Magnason, writer
- 14 July – Pétur Marteinsson, footballer
