= 1975 in Iceland =

- Decades: 1950s; 1960s; 1970s; 1980s; 1990s
- See also: Other events of 1975; Timeline of Icelandic history

The following lists events that happened in 1975 in Iceland.

== Incumbents ==
- President – Kristján Eldjárn
- Prime minister – Geir Hallgrímsson

== Events ==
- 24 October – Women's Strike

== Births ==
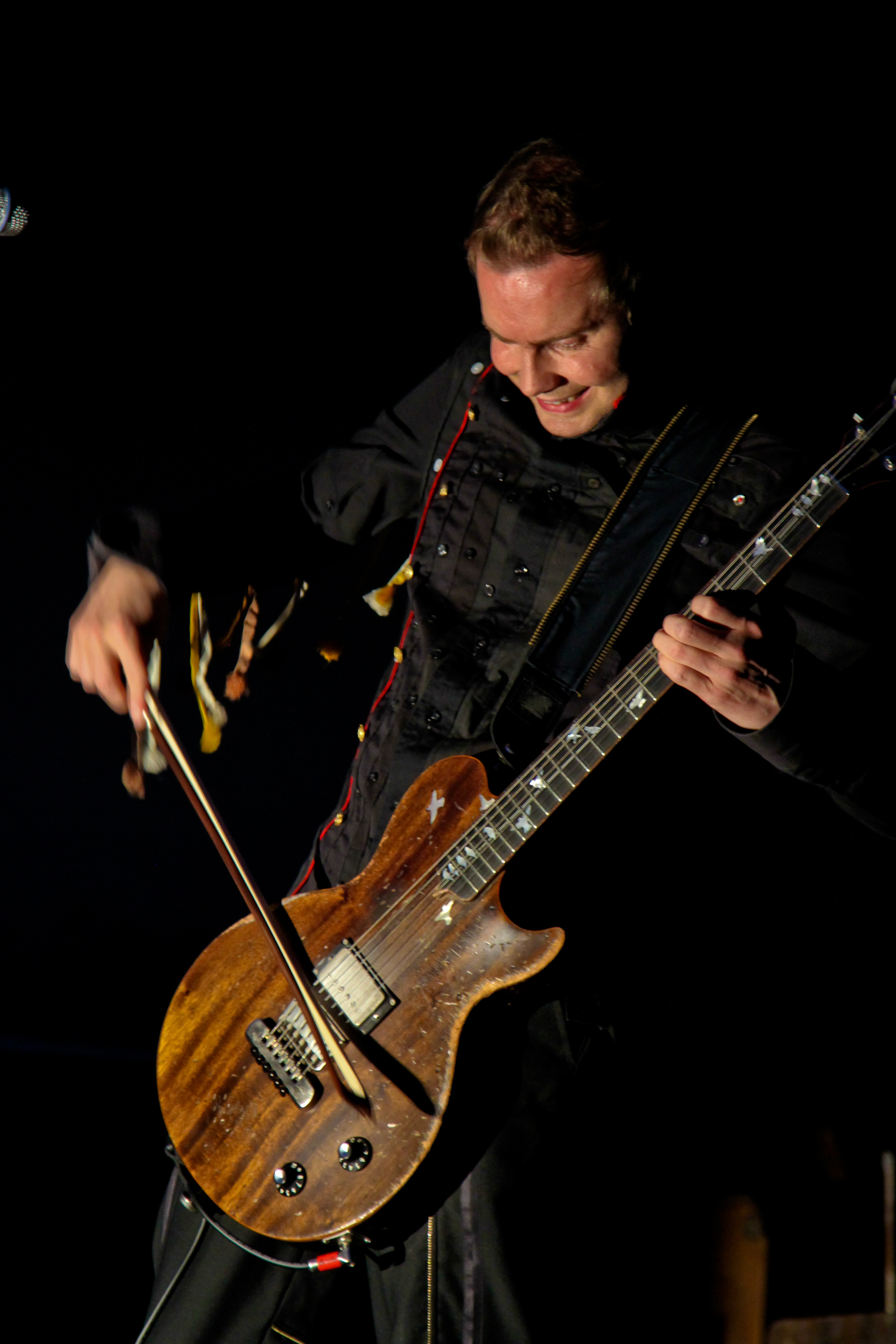
Jónsi

- 12 March – Sigmundur Davíð Gunnlaugsson, politician.
- 23 April – Jónsi, guitarist and vocalist
- 7 May – Árni Gautur Arason, footballer
- 15 May – Ólafur Örn Bjarnason, footballer
- 10 July – Stefán Karl Stefánsson, actor (d. 2018)
- 10 September – Barði Jóhannsson, musician, writer, TV show host, film director and clothing designer
- 26 September – Bergþór Ólason, politician
- 16 October – Brynjar Gunnarsson, footballer

=== Full date missing ===
- Heimir Björgúlfsson, artist

== Deaths ==
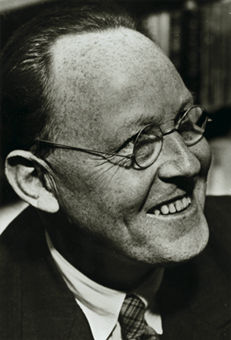
Gunnar Gunnarsson

- 22 August – Guðrún frá Lundi, poet and novelist (b. 1887)
- 21 November – Gunnar Gunnarsson, writer (b. 1889)
