= 1986 in Iceland =

- Decades: 1960s; 1970s; 1980s; 1990s; 2000s
- See also: Other events of 1986; Timeline of Icelandic history

The following lists events that happened in 1986 in Iceland.

== Incumbents ==
- President – Vigdís Finnbogadóttir
- Prime Minister – Steingrímur Hermannsson

== Events ==
- 3 May: Iceland makes its first participation in the Eurovision Song Contest with the song Gleðibankinn, sang by ICY band.
- 11–12 October: Reykjavík Summit between U.S. President Ronald Reagan and General Secretary of the Communist Party of the Soviet Union Mikhail Gorbachev.

== Births ==
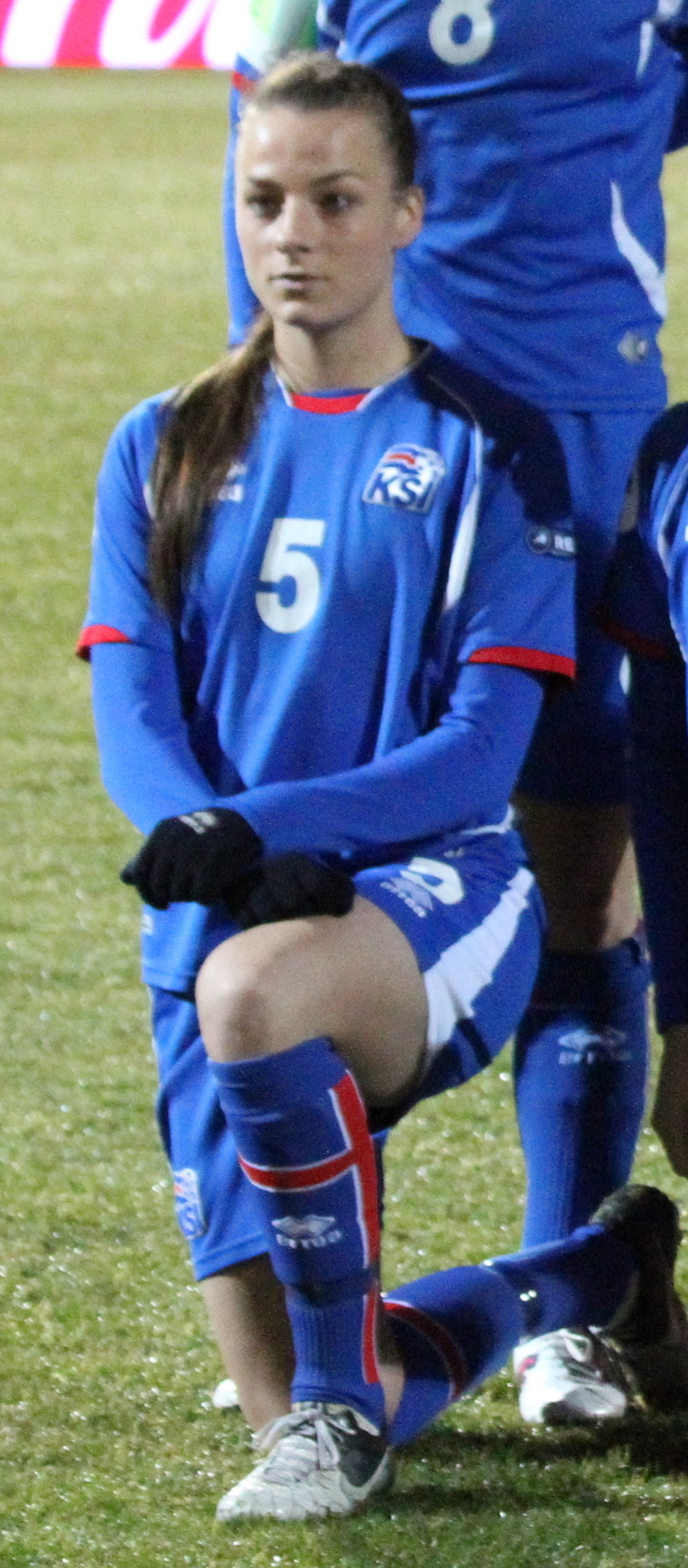
Hallbera Guðný Gísladóttir

- 19 June – Ragnar Sigurðsson, footballer.
- 25 July – Margrét Lára Viðarsdóttir, footballer.
- 14 September – Hallbera Guðný Gísladóttir, footballer
- 24 November – Guðmundur Pétursson, footballer

== Deaths ==
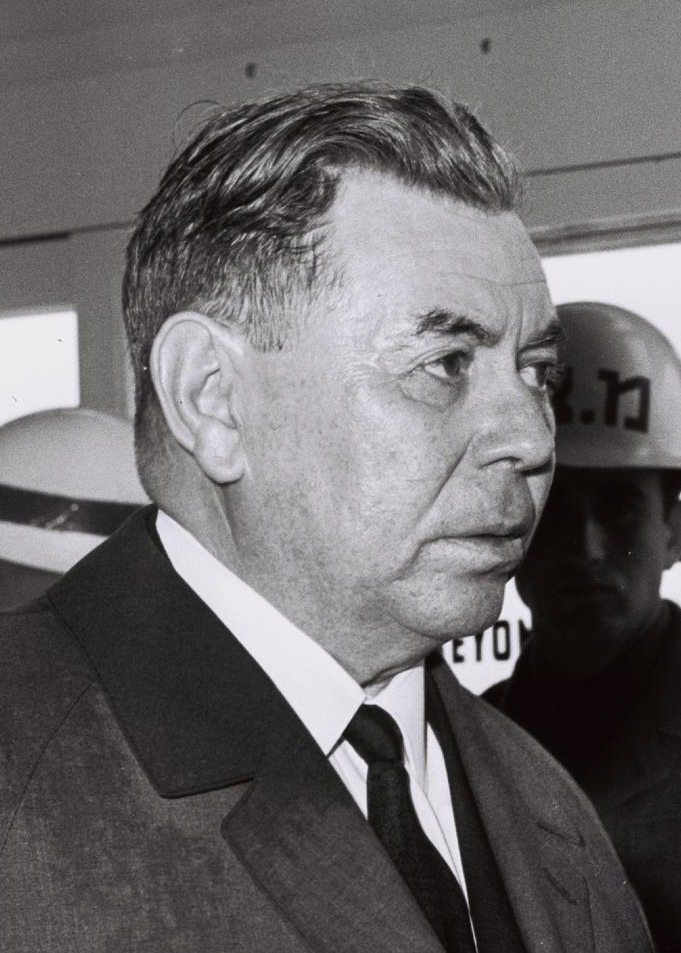
Emil Jónsson

- 19 January – Jón Helgason, philologist and poet (b. 1899)
- 30 November – Emil Jónsson, politician (b. 1902).
- 27 December – Snorri Hjartarson, poet (b. 1906)

=== Full date missing ===
- Gunnlaugur Halldórsson, architect (b. 1909)
