= 1988 in Iceland =

- Decades: 1960s; 1970s; 1980s; 1990s; 2000s
- See also: Other events of 1988; Timeline of Icelandic history

The following lists events that happened in 1988 in Iceland.

== Incumbents ==
- President – Vigdís Finnbogadóttir
- Prime Minister – Þorsteinn Pálsson, Steingrímur Hermannsson

== Events ==
- 22 April – The Shop and Office Workers Union begins a nationwide pay strike that halts most retail and clerical services for a fortnight.
- 30 April – Iceland’s entry “Þú og þeir (Sókrates)” places sixteenth at the Eurovision Song Contest final in Dublin.
- 10 May – After an all-night debate the Althing votes 13–8 to repeal Iceland’s 73-year ban on full-strength beer, with legal sales scheduled for 1 March 1989.
- 16 May – The government devalues the Icelandic króna by 10 percent to support the struggling fishing industry amid sliding export prices.
- 25 June – President Vigdís Finnbogadóttir wins re-election, securing a third consecutive four-year term.
- 17 November – Linda Pétursdóttir is crowned Miss World at the Royal Albert Hall in London, UK.
- 24 November – U.S. President Ronald Reagan signs amendments strengthening the Marine Mammal Protection Act, explicitly threatening sanctions against whaling nations such as Iceland.

== Births ==
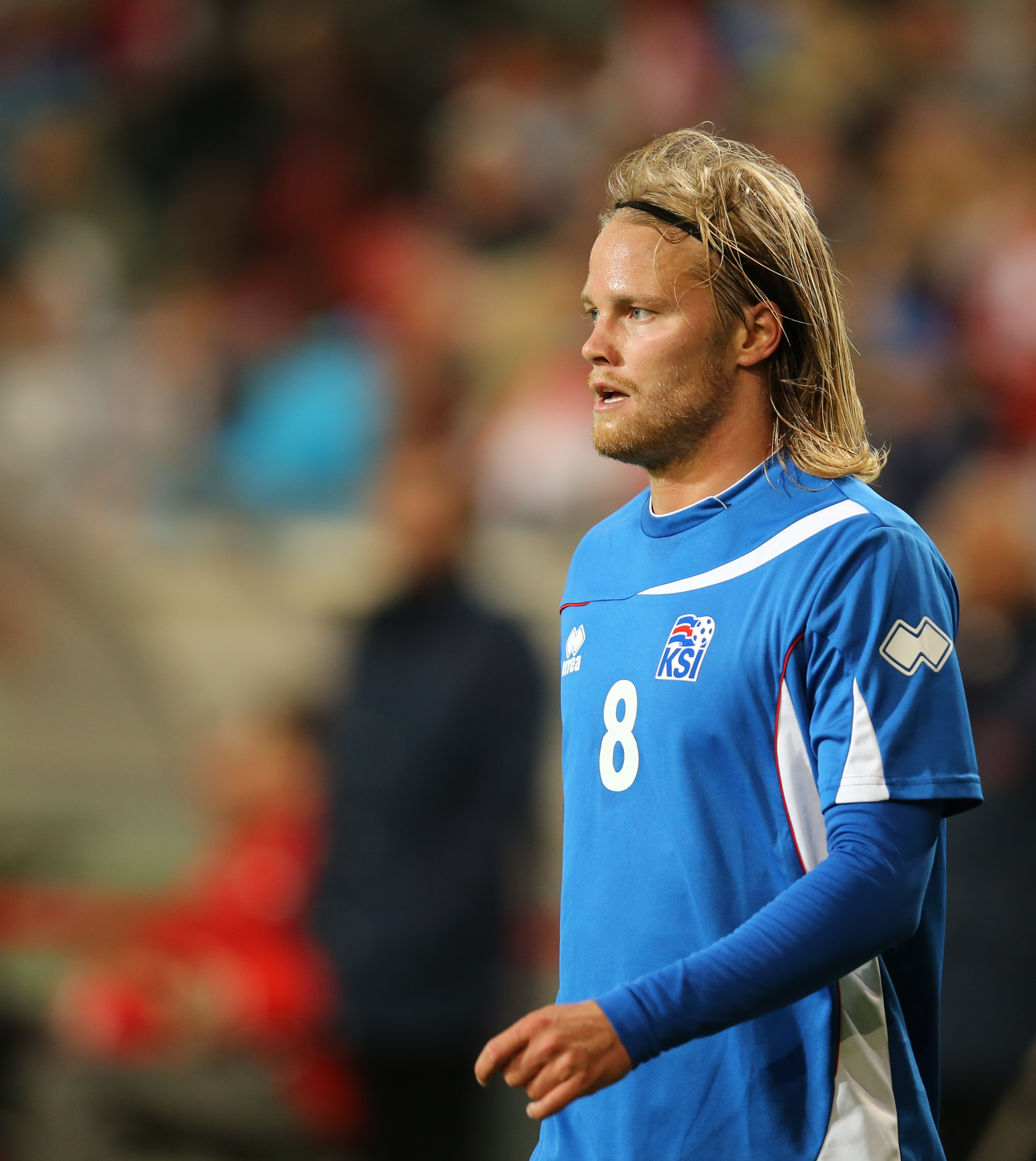
Birkir Bjarnason

- 15 February Sævar Birgisson, cross country skier.
- 18 April – Salka Sól Eyfeld, singer, actress, voice actress, radio host and TV-presenter
- 27 May – Birkir Bjarnason, footballer
- 28 July – Gunnar Nelson, martial artist
- 12 September – Guðmundur Ari Sigurjónsson, politician
- 22 November – Hafþór Júlíus Björnsson, strongman
- 27 December – Hera Hilmar, actress

== Deaths ==
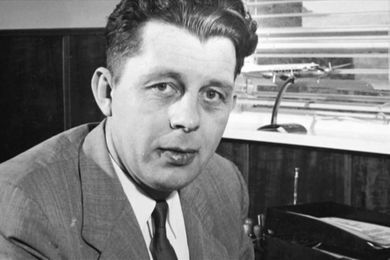
Alfred Eliasson

- Alfred Eliasson, businessman (b. 1920)
