= 1974 in Iceland =

- Decades: 1950s; 1960s; 1970s; 1980s; 1990s
- See also: Other events of 1974; Timeline of Icelandic history

The following lists events that happened in 1974 in Iceland.

== Incumbents ==
- President – Kristján Eldjárn
- Prime Minister – Ólafur Jóhannesson, Geir Hallgrímsson

== Events ==
- Geirfinnur case

== Births ==
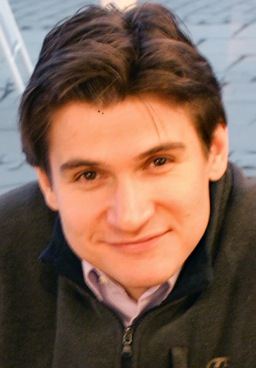
Garðar Thór Cortes

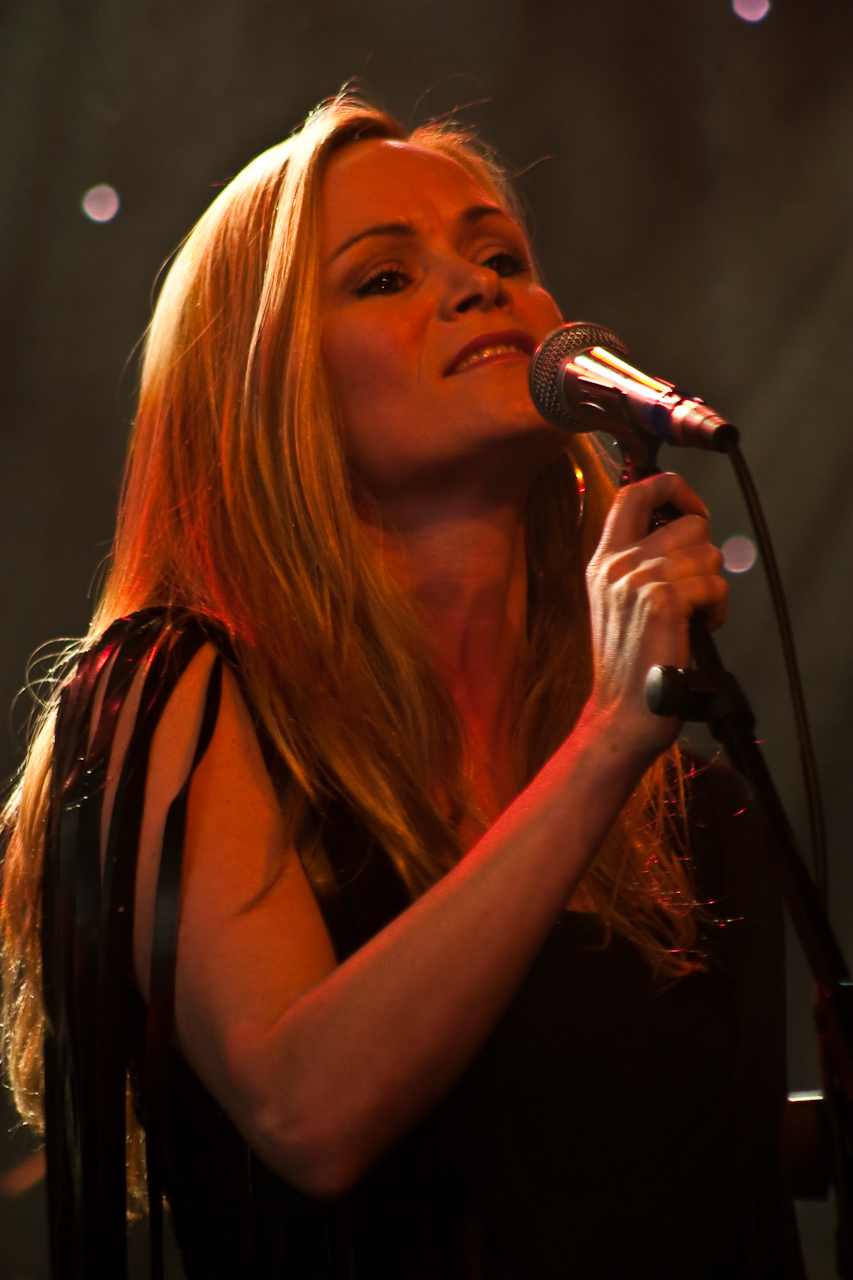
Selma Björnsdóttir

- 25 February – Nína Dögg Filippusdóttir, actress
- 27 March – Kristján Helgason, snooker player
- 2 May – Garðar Thór Cortes, singer
- 6 May – Birkir Hólm Guðnason, business leader
- 13 June – Selma Björnsdóttir, actress and singer
- 11 July – Hermann Hreiðarsson, footballer
- 3 September – Guðmundur Benediktsson, footballer.
- 17 September – Helgi Sigurðsson, footballer

=== Full date missing ===
- Guðmundur Þór Kárason, puppet designer and puppeteer

== Deaths ==
- 4 March – Guðni Jónsson, professor of history and editor of Old Norse texts (b. 1901)
- 20 April – Guðmundur Guðmundsson, chess player (b. 1918)
- 21 September – Sigurður Nordal, scholar, writer and ambassador (b. 1876)
- 8 November – Sesselja Sigmundsdottir, pioneer in the fields of pedagogy and the care for the mentally disabled (b 1902)
- 12 November – Þórbergur Þórðarson, author and Esperantist (b. 1888 or 1889)
