= Reynir Pétur Ingvarsson =

- Born: 25 October 1948 (age 77)
- Known for: 1985 walk around Iceland

Reynir Pétur Ingvarsson (born 25 October 1948) is an Icelandic long-distance walker. He gained national attention in Iceland in 1985 when he walked the ringroad around the country to raise money for the Sólheimar Ecovillage. Reynir's walk started on 25 May 1985 and took 32 days with 5 million ISK being raised during the march. A crowd of 12-14 thousand people greeted him in when he passed through Reykjavík on 24 June. He finished his walk on 25 June in Selfoss where he was greeted by several thousand people.
