= 1978 in Iceland =

- Decades: 1950s; 1960s; 1970s; 1980s; 1990s
- See also: Other events of 1978; Timeline of Icelandic history

The following lists events that happened in 1978 in Iceland.

== Incumbents ==
- President – Kristján Eldjárn
- Prime Minister – Geir Hallgrímsson, Ólafur Jóhannesson

== Births ==
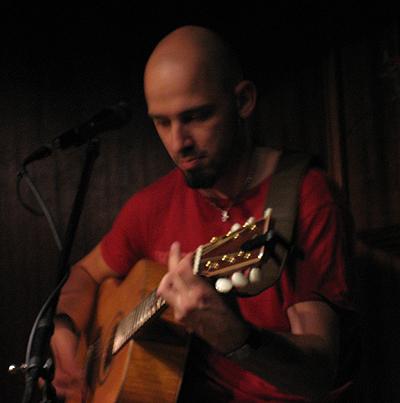
Magni Ásgeirsson

- 16 February – Vala Flosadóttir, athlete.
- 15 March – Arnar Viðarsson, footballer
- 15 September – Eiður Guðjohnsen, footballer
- 27 October – Gylfi Einarsson, footballer
- 1 December – Magni Ásgeirsson, musician

== Deaths ==
- 28 March – Vilhjálmur Vilhjálmsson, singer (b. 1945)
- 4 October – Una Guðmundsdóttir, educator and psychic (b. 1894)
