= 1979 in Iceland =

- Decades: 1950s; 1960s; 1970s; 1980s; 1990s
- See also: Other events of 1979; Timeline of Icelandic history

The following lists events that happened in 1979 in Iceland.

== Incumbents ==
- President – Kristján Eldjárn
- Prime Minister – Ólafur Jóhannesson (until 15 October), Benedikt Sigurðsson Gröndal (since 15 October)

== Events ==
- April 19 – The Church in Ytri-Njarðvík was opened.
- The hot water utility was formally founded in Hvanneyri.

== Births ==
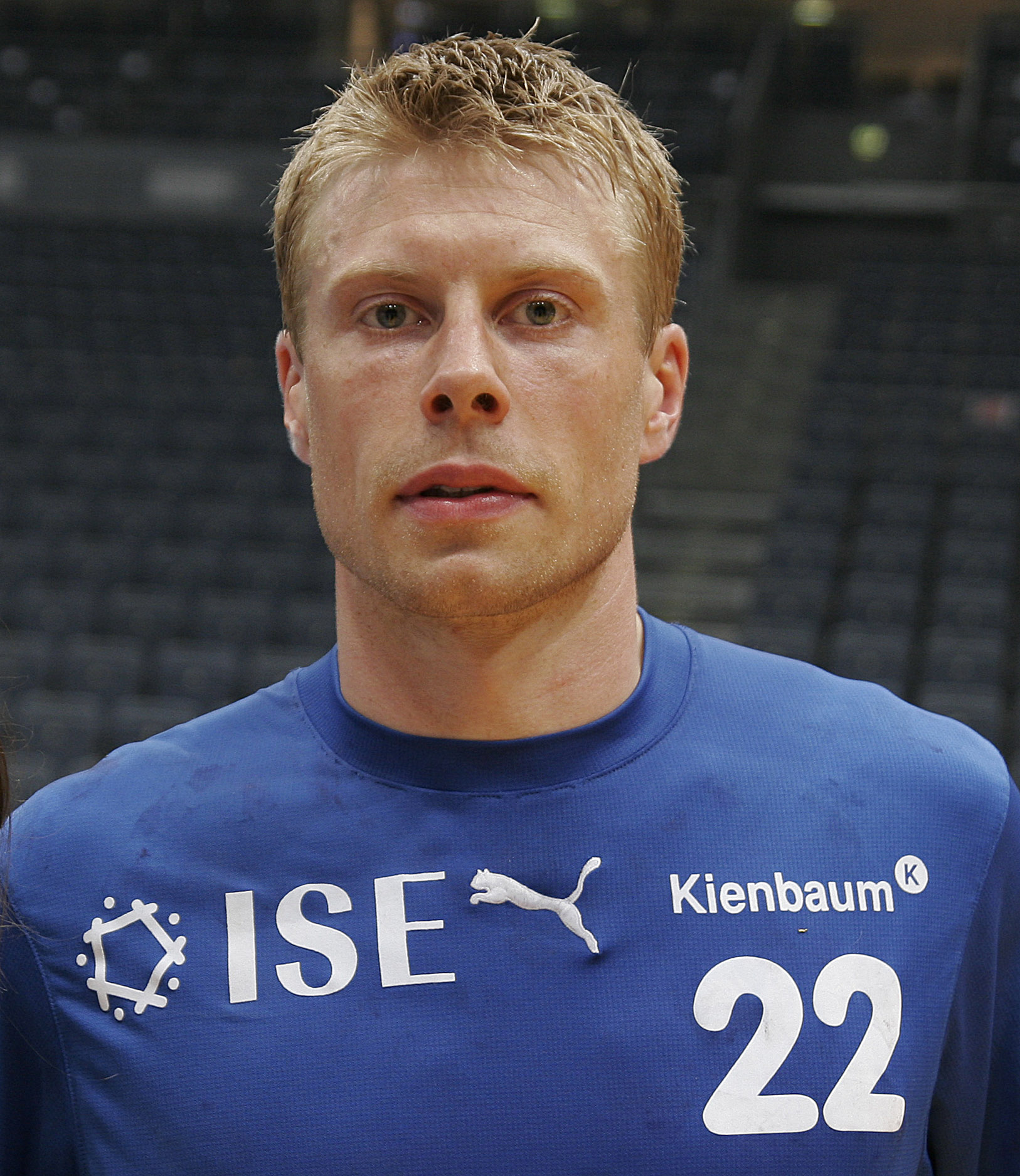
Guðjón Valur Sigurðsson

- February 11 – Hanna Guðrún Stefánsdóttir, handball player
- February 26 – Bjarni Guðjónsson, footballer
- February 26 – Daníel Bjarnason, composer and conductor
- June 11 – Helgi Sveinsson, Paralympian athlete
- July 5 – Eva Maria Daniels, film producer (d. 2023)
- July 15 – Edda Garðarsdóttir, footballer
- July 28 – Birgitta Haukdal, singer
- August 8 – Guðjón Valur Sigurðsson, handball player
- October 25 – Björn Thorfinnsson, chess player
- November 28 – Jóhannes Ásbjörnsson, TV and radio show host

== Deaths ==
- February 22 – Þorsteinn Þorsteinsson, economist (b. 1880)
