= 1982 in Iceland =

- Decades: 1960s; 1970s; 1980s; 1990s; 2000s
- See also: Other events of 1982; Timeline of Icelandic history

The following lists events that happened in 1982 in Iceland.

== Incumbents ==
- President – Vigdís Finnbogadóttir
- Prime Minister – Gunnar Thoroddsen

== Events ==
- The release of the documentary Rokk í Reykjavík
- Women's representation increased in municipal elections which made a progress in gender equality.

== Births ==
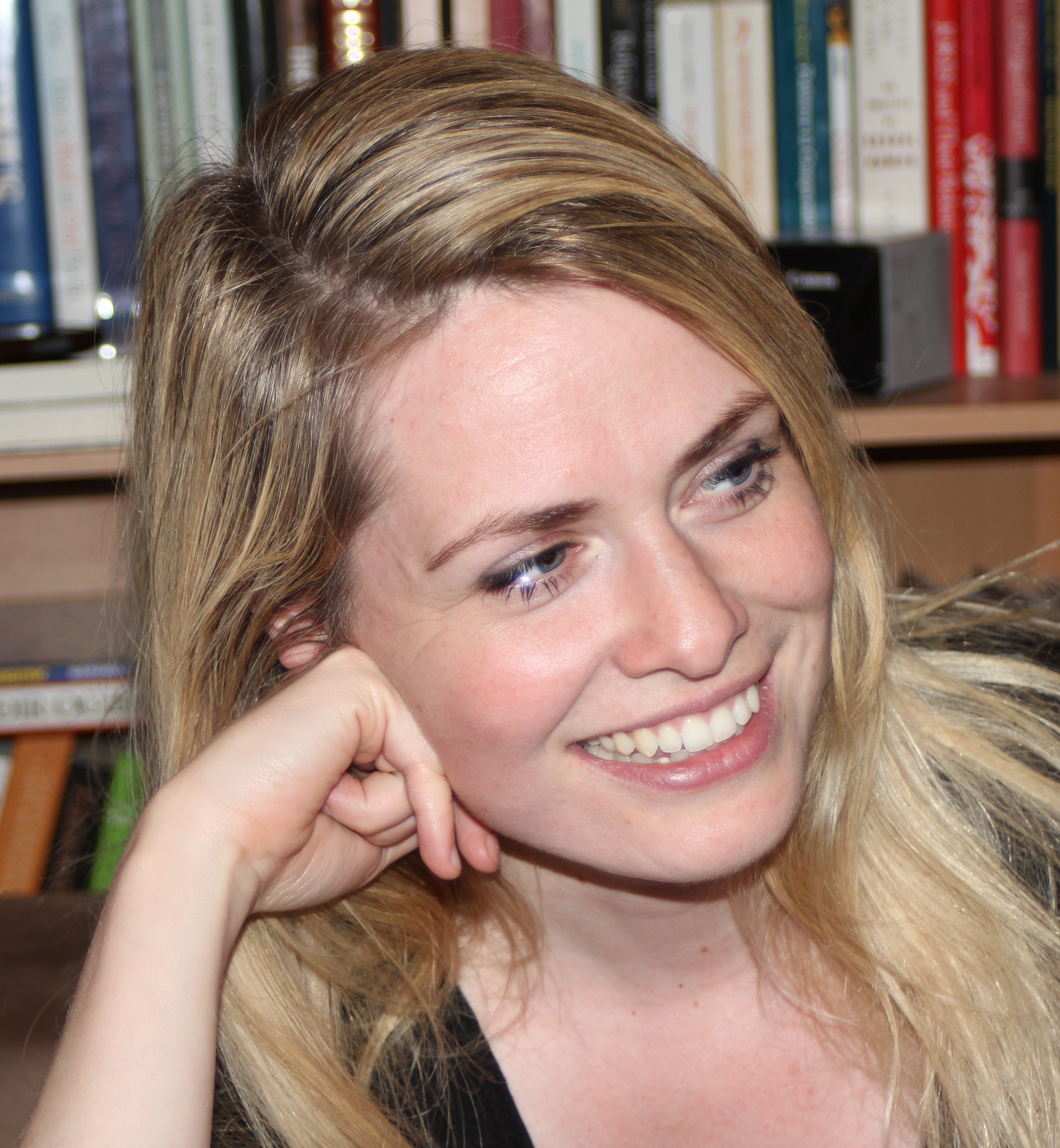
Bryndís Björgvinsdóttir

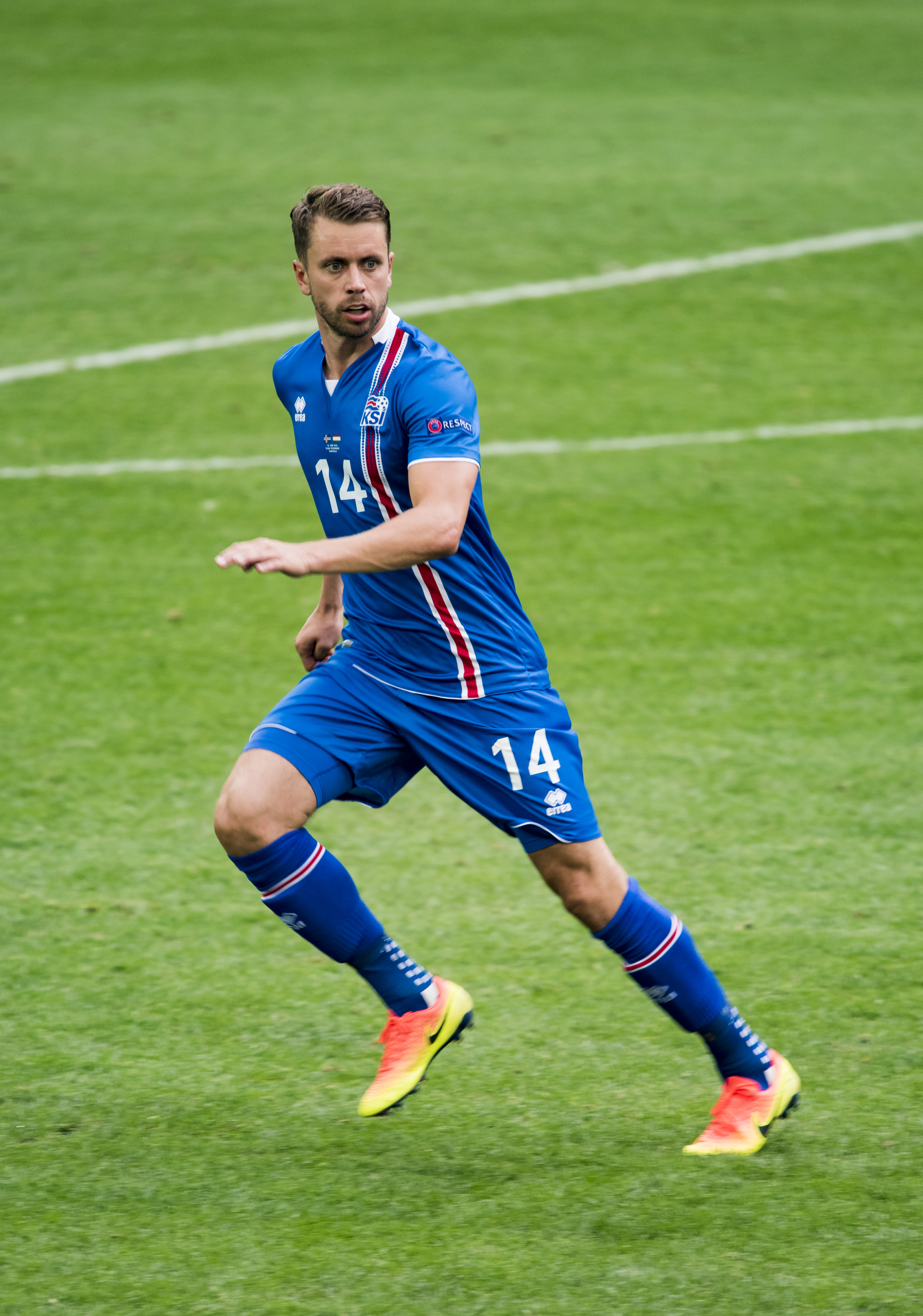
Kári Árnason

- 5 January – Kristín Anna Valtýsdóttir, musician
- 9 January – Grétar Steinsson, footballer.
- 24 March – Bryndís Björgvinsdóttir, folklorist
- 1 April – Gunnar Heiðar Þorvaldsson, footballer
- 13 October – Kári Árnason, footballer

== Deaths ==
- 9 December – Ásmundur Sveinsson, sculptor (b. 1893)
