= 1981 in Iceland =

- Decades: 1960s; 1970s; 1980s; 1990s; 2000s
- See also: Other events of 1981; Timeline of Icelandic history

The following lists events that happened in 1981 in Iceland.

== Incumbents ==
- President – Vigdís Finnbogadóttir
- Prime Minister – Gunnar Thoroddsen

== Events ==
- Iceland no longer has an army due to a shortage of money
- Pétur Sigurgeirsson became the eleventh Bishop of Iceland, succeeding Sigurbjörn Einarsson in the position.
- The Icelandic punk band Þeyr released the song "Rúdolf," which gained attention for its anti-fascist commentary on Nazism.
- A national census was conducted in 1981.
- Circulation of the new króna begins after 1980 currency reform.

== Births ==
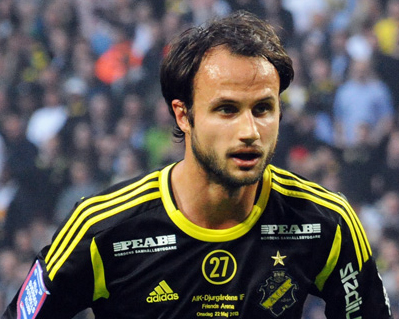
Helgi Daníelsson

- 7 January – Ármann Smári Björnsson, footballer
- 22 March – Rakel Logadóttir, footballer
- 29 April – Ragnhildur Steinunn Jónsdóttir, television personality
- 13 July – Helgi Daníelsson, footballer
- 31 August – Örn Arnarson, swimmer.
- 5 September – Logi Gunnarsson, basketball player
- 4 October – Friðrik Ómar, singer
- 12 October – Indriði Sigurðsson, footballer
- 17 October – Snorri Guðjónsson, handball player
- 10 December – Hólmar Örn Rúnarsson, footballer
- 14 December – Haraldur Freyr Guðmundsson, footballer

== Deaths ==
- 28 July – Magnús Kjartansson, journalist, writer, and politician (born 1919).
