= 1983 in Iceland =

- Decades: 1960s; 1970s; 1980s; 1990s; 2000s
- See also: Other events of 1983; Timeline of Icelandic history

The following lists events that happened in 1983 in Iceland.

== Incumbents ==
- President – Vigdís Finnbogadóttir
- Prime Minister – Gunnar Thoroddsen, Steingrímur Hermannsson

== Events ==
- 13 March – The feminist political party, Women's List, was founded.
- The social-democratic political party, Alliance of Social Democrats, was founded.

== Births ==
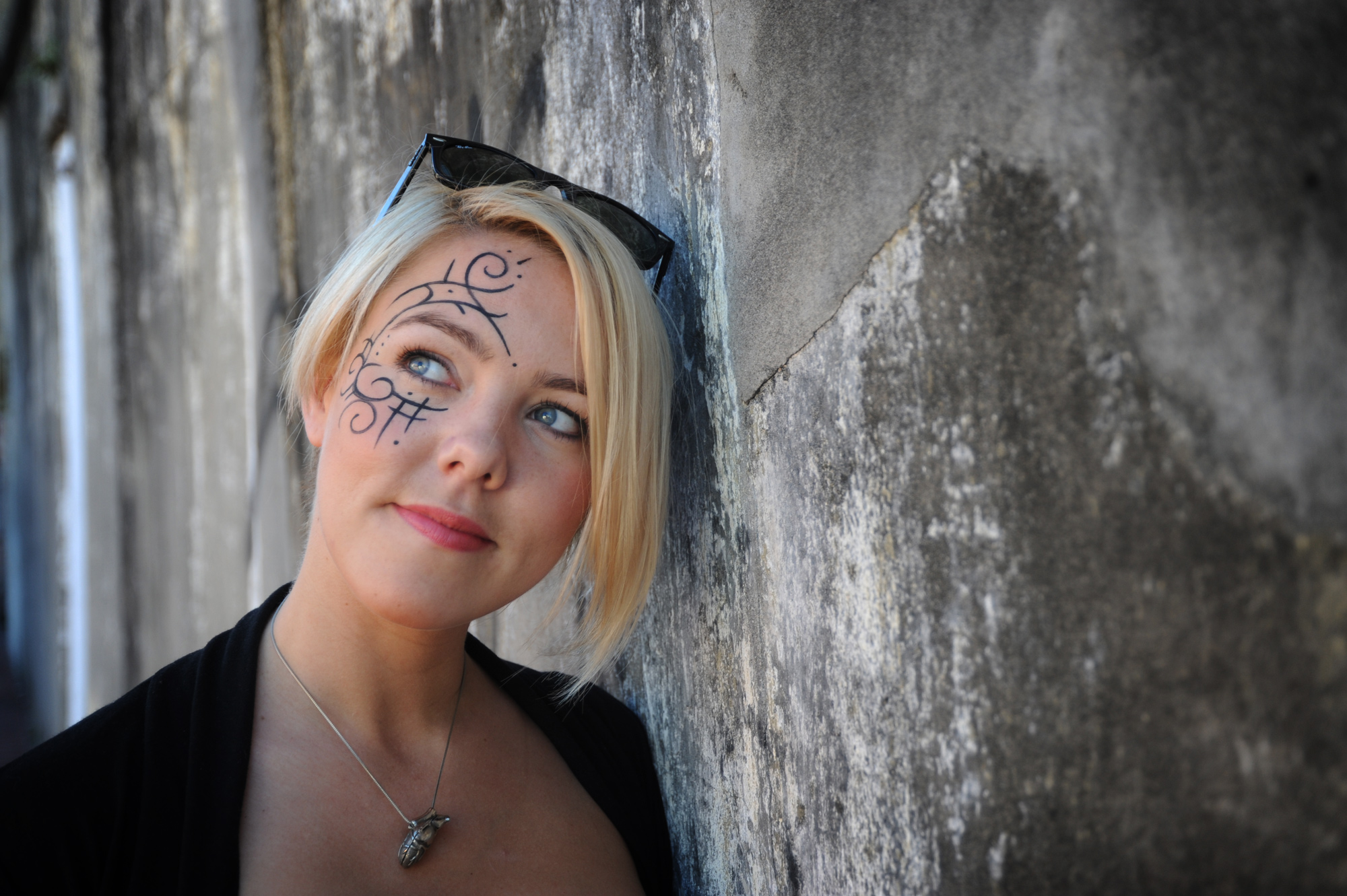
Hera Hjartardóttir

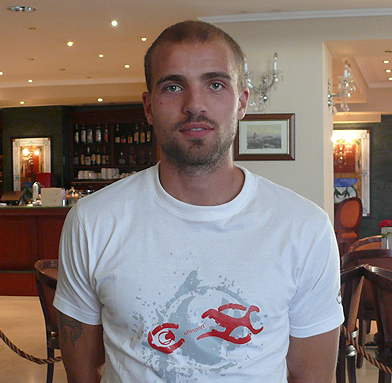
Garðar Gunnlaugsson

- 1 April – Hera Hjartardóttir, singer-songwriter
- 1 April – Ólafur Ingi Skúlason, footballer.
- 7 September – Garðar Gunnlaugsson, footballer

== Deaths ==
- 19 June – Vilmundur Gylfason, politician, historian and poet (b. 1948)
- 8 February – Sigurður Þórarinsson, geologist (b. 1912)
- 25 September – Gunnar Thoroddsen, politician (b. 1910)
