= 1989 in Iceland =

- Decades: 1960s; 1970s; 1980s; 1990s; 2000s
- See also: Other events of 1989; Timeline of Icelandic history

The following lists events that happened in 1989 in Iceland.

== Incumbents ==
- President – Vigdís Finnbogadóttir
- Prime Minister – Steingrímur Hermannsson

== Events ==
- 1 March – The 74-year prohibition of beer was lifted, marking the celebration of Beer Day.
- June 4 – Pope John Paul II celebrated an outdoor Mass in Reykjavik at the Cathedral of Christ the King during his papal visit to Iceland.
- Ólafur Skúlason became the twelfth Bishop of Iceland, succeeding Pétur Sigurgeirsson in the position.

== Births ==
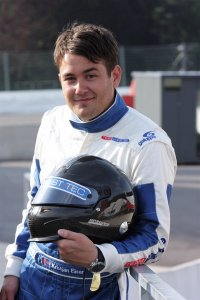
Kristján Einar

- 8 January – Kristján Einar, racing driver
- 1 February – Alfreð Finnbogason, footballer
- 10 March – Brynjar Guðmundsson, alpine skier.
- 22 April – Aron Gunnarsson, footballer
- 29 May – Eyþór Ingi Gunnlaugsson, singer
- 19 June – Ögmundur Kristinsson, footballer
- 8 September – Gylfi Sigurðsson, footballer
- 18 September – Anníe Mist Þórisdóttir, CrossFit athlete

== Deaths ==
- 13 March – Haukur Óskarsson, footballer (b. 1915)
- 16 April – Brynjólfur Bjarnason, politician (b. 1898)

=== Full date missing ===
- Jón Gunnar Árnason, sculptor (b. 1931)
- Ragnar Kjartansson, sculptor (b. 1923)
