= 1980 in Iceland =

- Decades: 1960s; 1970s; 1980s; 1990s; 2000s
- See also: Other events of 1980; Timeline of Icelandic history

The following lists events that happened in 1980 in Iceland.

== Incumbents ==
- President – Kristján Eldjárn, Vigdís Finnbogadóttir
- Prime Minister – Benedikt Gröndal, Gunnar Thoroddsen

== Events ==
- Vigdis Finnbogadottir becomes first woman president of Iceland.

== Births ==
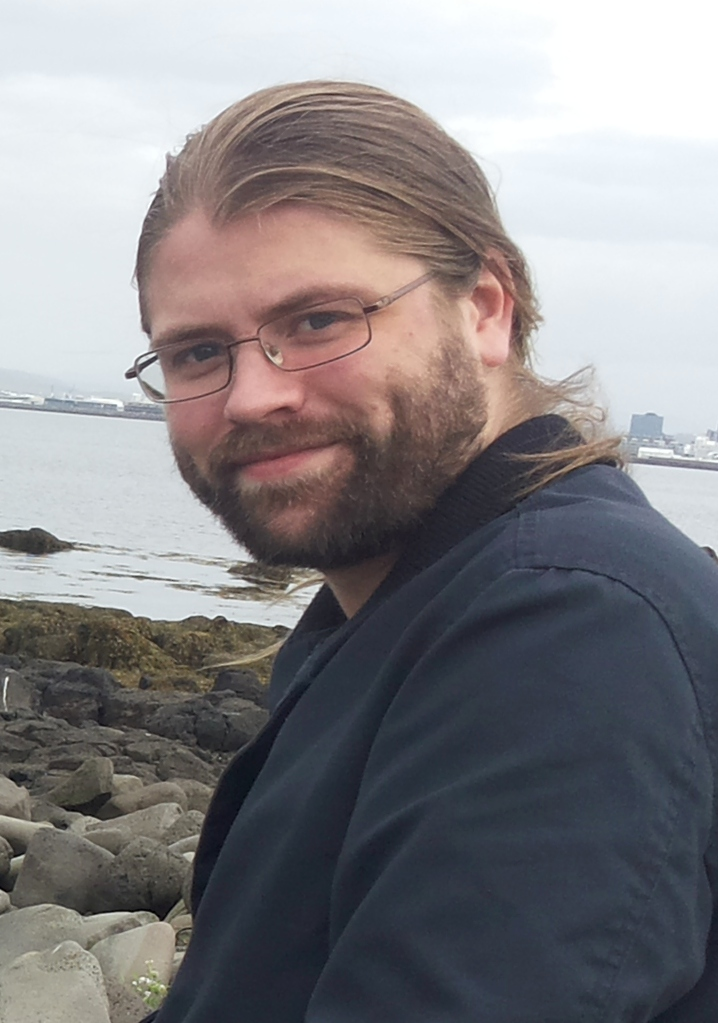
Helgi Hrafn Gunnarsson

- 21 March – Veigar Páll Gunnarsson, footballer
- 10 May – Dagný Skúladóttir, handball player
- 22 May – Róbert Gunnarsson, handball player.
- 25 May – Joey Guðjónsson, footballer
- 20 July – Sturla Ásgeirsson, handball player.
- 7 October – Kristján Örn Sigurðsson, footballer
- 21 October – Kristján Þórður Snæbjarnarson, politician
- 22 October – Helgi Hrafn Gunnarsson, politician
- 18 December – Marel Baldvinsson, footballer

== Deaths ==
- 20 October – Stefán Jóhann Stefánsson, politician (b. 1894).

=== Full date missing ===
- Jón Guðmundsson, chess player (b. 1904)
