= 2003–04 FA Cup =

Tournament details
- Country: England; Wales

Final positions
- Champions: Manchester United (11th title)
- Runners-up: Millwall

Tournament statistics
- Top goal scorer(s): Garry Barnes Scott Taylor; Ruud van Nistelrooy (6 goals)

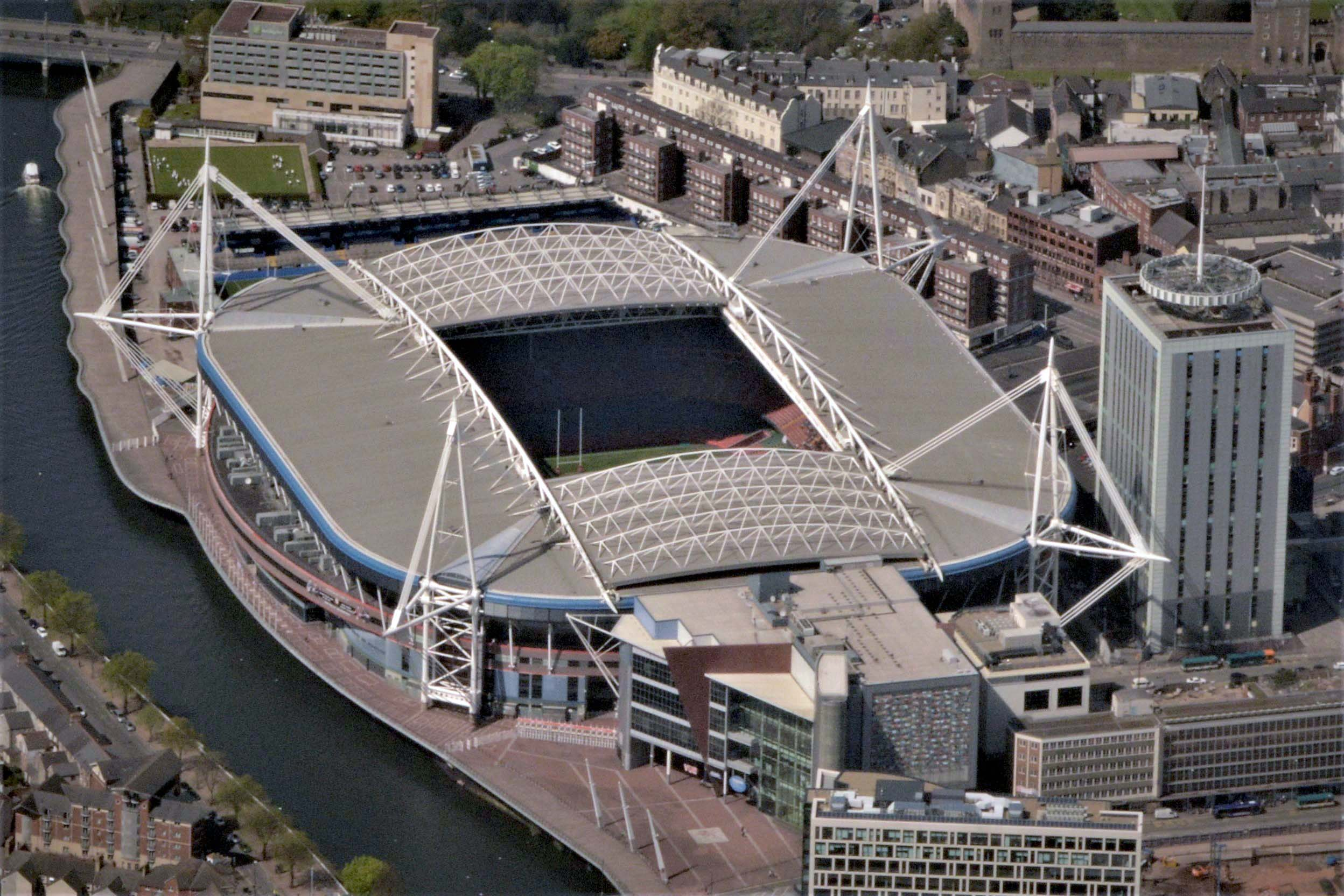
Millennium Stadium, site of the cup final

The 2003–04 FA Cup was the 123rd staging of England and the world's oldest football competition, the FA Cup. The competition began on 23 August 2003, with the lowest-ranked of the entrants competing in the Extra preliminary round. In the third round, the clubs from the Premiership and Division One competed in the competition for the first time.

The semi-finals were staged at neutral venues and, like the final, would not be replayed in the event of a draw. The competition culminated with the cup final at the Millennium Stadium, Cardiff for a fourth year in a row, since Wembley Stadium was still in the rebuilding process. The cup was won by Manchester United for a record 11th time, with a 3–0 victory over Millwall from Division One.

The appearance in the cup final by Millwall, a Level 2 team, marked the first time in 12 years that a team outside Level 1 of the English football pyramid appeared in the final game.

== Calendar ==
Round	Date (weekend of)	Matches	Clubs	Prize money
Extra preliminary round	Saturday 23 August 2003	73	661 → 588	£500
Preliminary round	Saturday 30 August 2003	182	588 → 406	£1,000
First round qualifying	Saturday 20 September 2003	124	406 → 282	£2,250
Second round qualifying	Saturday 27 September 2003	84	282 → 198	£3,750
Third round qualifying	Saturday 11 October 2003	42	198 → 156	£5,000
Fourth round qualifying	Saturday 25 October 2003	32	156 → 124	£10,000
First round proper	Saturday 8 November 2003	40	124 → 84	£16,000
Second round proper	Saturday 6 December 2003	20	84 → 64	£24,000
Third round proper	Saturday 3 January 2004	32	64 → 32	£40,000
Fourth round proper	Saturday 24 January 2004	16	32 → 16	£60,000
Fifth round proper	Saturday 14 February 2004	8	16 → 8	£120,000
Sixth round proper	Saturday 6 March 2004	4	8 → 4	£300,000
Semi-finals	Saturday 3 April 2004	2	4 → 2	£900,000
Final	Saturday 22 May 2004	1	2 → 1	£1,000,000

== Qualifying rounds ==
All participating clubs that were not members of the Premier League or Football League entered the competition in the qualifying rounds to secure one of 32 places available in the first round proper.

The winners from the fourth qualifying round were Stalybridge Celtic, Lancaster City, Grantham Town, Chester City, Whitby Town, Shrewsbury Town, Burton Albion, Telford United, Scarborough, Gainsborough Trinity, Accrington Stanley, Northwich Victoria, Bradford Park Avenue, Shildon, Histon, Stevenage Borough, Barnet, Farnborough Town, Grays Athletic, Weston-super-Mare, Boreham Wood, Aldershot Town, Thurrock, Hereford United, Bishop's Stortford, Salisbury City, Ford United, Canvey Island, Hornchurch, Woking, Crawley Town and Gravesend & Northfleet.

Histon, Thurrock and Hornchurch were appearing in the competition proper for the first time. Of the others, Accrington Stanley and Weston-super-Mare had last featured at this stage in 1993–94, Bishop's Stortford had last done so in 1986-87, Grantham Town had last done so in 1975-76, Bradford Park Avenue had last done so in 1970-71 and Shildon had last done so in 1961-62.

== First round proper ==
This round is the first in which Football League teams from Second and Third Division compete with non-league teams. Luton Town's Adrian Forbes and Sheffield Wednesday's Adam Proudlock netted hat tricks. Shildon, of the Northern League at level 8 of the English football pyramid, was the lowest ranked team in the round.

- Ties were played over the weekend of 8 November 2003.

Tie no	Home team	Score	Away team
1	Lincoln City (4)	3–1	Brighton & Hove Albion (3)
2	Peterborough United (3)	2–0	Hereford United (5)
3	Oldham Athletic (3)	3–0	Carlisle United (4)
4	Cheltenham Town (4)	3–1	Hull City (4)
5	Yeovil Town (4)	4–1	Wrexham (3)
6	Macclesfield Town (4)	3–0	Boston United (4)
7	Grays Athletic (6)	1–2	Aldershot Town (5)
8	Scarborough (5)	1–0	Doncaster Rovers (4)
9	Barnet (5)	2–2	Stalybridge Celtic (6)
replay	Stalybridge Celtic (6)	0–2	Barnet (5)
10	Blackpool (3)	4–0	Boreham Wood (7)
11	Wycombe Wanderers (3)	4–1	Swindon Town (3)
12	Lancaster City (6)	1–2	Cambridge United (4)
13	Woking (5)	3–1	Histon (7)
14	AFC Bournemouth (3)	1–0	Bristol Rovers (4)
15	Stevenage Borough (5)	2–1	Stockport County (3)
16	Grantham Town (6)	1–2	Leyton Orient (4)
17	Thurrock (6)	1–1	Luton Town (3)
replay	Luton Town (3)	3–1	Thurrock (6)
18	Northampton Town (4)	3–2	Plymouth Argyle (3)
19	Tranmere Rovers (3)	3–2	Chesterfield (3)
20	Hornchurch (6)	2–0	Darlington (4)
21	Scunthorpe United (4)	2–1	Shrewsbury Town (5)
22	Torquay United (4)	1–2	Burton Albion (5)
23	Accrington Stanley (5)	1–0	Huddersfield Town (4)
24	Grimsby Town (3)	1–0	Queens Park Rangers (3)
25	Notts County (3)	7–2	Shildon (8)
26	Brentford (3)	7–1	Gainsborough Trinity (6)
27	Kidderminster Harriers (4)	2–1	Northwich Victoria (5)
28	Southend United (4)	1–1	Canvey Island (6)
replay	Canvey Island (6)	2–3	Southend United (4)
29	York City (4)	1–2	Barnsley (3)
30	Port Vale (3)	2–2	Ford United (6)
replay	Ford United (6)	1–2	Port Vale (3)
31	Mansfield Town (4)	6–0	Bishop's Stortford (6)
32	Sheffield Wednesday (3)	4–0	Salisbury City (7)
33	Farnborough Town (5)	0–1	Weston-super-Mare (6)
34	Chester City (5)	0–1	Gravesend & Northfleet (5)
35	Telford United (5)	3–2	Crawley Town (6)
36	Colchester United (3)	1–0	Oxford United (4)
37	Bradford Park Avenue (6)	2–5	Bristol City (3)
38	Bury (4)	1–2	Rochdale (4)
39	Swansea City (4)	3–0	Rushden & Diamonds (3)
40	Hartlepool United (3)	4–0	Whitby Town (6)

== Second round proper ==
Ties were played over the weekend of 6 December 2003. Mansfield's Liam Lawrence showed how interested Championship and premiership clubs were with him by netting a hat trick. Step 6 sides Weston-super-Mare, from the Southern League Premier Division, and Hornchurch, from the Isthmian League Premier Division, were the lowest-ranked teams in the round.

Tie no	Home team	Score	Away team
1	Northampton Town (4)	4–1	Weston-super-Mare (6)
2	Rochdale (4)	0–2	Luton Town (3)
3	Colchester United (3)	1–0	Aldershot Town (5)
4	Macclesfield Town (4)	1–1	Cambridge United (4)
replay	Cambridge United (4)	2–2	Macclesfield Town (4)
Macclesfield Town won 4–2 on penalties
5	Peterborough United (3)	3–2	Grimsby Town (3)
6	Bristol City (3)	0–0	Barnsley (3)
replay	Barnsley (3)	2–1	Bristol City (3)
7	Oldham Athletic (3)	2–5	Blackpool (3)
8	Burton Albion (5)	0–1	Hartlepool United (3)
9	Gravesend & Northfleet (5)	1–2	Notts County (3)
10	Telford United (5)	3–0	Brentford (3)
11	Woking (5)	0–3	Kidderminster Harriers (4)
12	Hornchurch (6)	0–1	Tranmere Rovers (3)
13	Yeovil Town (4)	5–1	Barnet (5)
14	AFC Bournemouth (3)	1–1	Accrington Stanley (5)
replay	Accrington Stanley (5)	0–0	AFC Bournemouth (3)
Accrington Stanley won 5–3 on penalties
15	Cheltenham Town (4)	3–1	Leyton Orient (4)
16	Port Vale (3)	0–1	Scarborough (5)
17	Wycombe Wanderers (3)	1–1	Mansfield Town (4)
replay	Mansfield Town (4)	3–2	Wycombe Wanderers (3)
18	Southend United (4)	3–0	Lincoln City (4)
19	Scunthorpe United (4)	2–2	Sheffield Wednesday (3)
replay	Sheffield Wednesday (3)	0–0	Scunthorpe United (4)
Scunthorpe United won 3–1 on penalties
20	Swansea City (4)	2–1	Stevenage Borough (5)

== Third round proper ==
This round marks the point at which First Division and Premier League (top-flight) teams enter the competition. Matches were played on the weekend of Saturday, 3 January 2004, with replays on 13 January and 14 January. The draw included three clubs from the Football Conference (Step 5): Telford United, Scarborough and Accrington Stanley.

Tie no	Home team	Score	Away team
1	Preston North End (2)	3–3	Reading (2)
replay	Reading (2)	1–2	Preston North End (2)
2	Southampton (1)	0–3	Newcastle United (1)
3	Watford (2)	2–2	Chelsea (1)
replay	Chelsea (1)	4–0	Watford (2)
4	Yeovil Town (4)	0–2	Liverpool (1)
5	Gillingham (2)	3–2	Charlton Athletic (1)
6	Nottingham Forest (2)	1–0	West Bromwich Albion (2)
7	Aston Villa (1)	1–2	Manchester United (1)
8	Crewe Alexandra (2)	0–1	Telford United (5)
9	Middlesbrough (1)	2–1	Notts County (3)
10	Sunderland (2)	1–0	Hartlepool United (3)
11	Everton (1)	3–1	Norwich City (2)
12	Ipswich Town (2)	3–0	Derby County (2)
13	Tranmere Rovers (3)	1–1	Bolton Wanderers (1)
replay	Bolton Wanderers (1)	1–2	Tranmere Rovers (3)
14	Tottenham Hotspur (1)	3–0	Crystal Palace (2)
15	Manchester City (1)	2–2	Leicester City (1)
replay	Leicester City (1)	1–3	Manchester City (1)
16	Kidderminster Harriers (4)	1–1	Wolverhampton Wanderers (1)
replay	Wolverhampton Wanderers (1)	2–0	Kidderminster Harriers (4)
17	Fulham (1)	2–1	Cheltenham Town (4)
18	Barnsley (3)	0–0	Scunthorpe United (4)
replay	Scunthorpe United (4)	2–0	Barnsley (3)
19	Northampton Town (4)	1–1	Rotherham United (2)
replay	Rotherham United (2)	1–2	Northampton Town (4)
20	Coventry City (2)	2–1	Peterborough United (3)
21	Portsmouth (1)	2–1	Blackpool (3)
22	Bradford City (2)	1–2	Luton Town (3)
23	Millwall (2)	2–1	Walsall (2)
24	Wimbledon (2)	1–1	Stoke City (2)
replay	Stoke City (2)	0–1	Wimbledon (2)
25	Southend United (4)	1–1	Scarborough (5)
replay	Scarborough (5)	1–0	Southend United (4)
26	Mansfield Town (4)	0–2	Burnley (2)
27	Cardiff City (2)	0–1	Sheffield United (2)
28	Leeds United (1)	1–4	Arsenal (1)
29	Wigan Athletic (2)	1–2	West Ham United (2)
30	Birmingham City (1)	4–0	Blackburn Rovers (1)
31	Swansea City (4)	2–1	Macclesfield Town (4)
32	Accrington Stanley (5)	0–0	Colchester United (3)
replay	Colchester United (3)	2–1	Accrington Stanley (5)

== Fourth round proper ==
Ties played during the weekend of 24 January 2004, with replays on 3 February and 4 February. Telford United and Scarborough were again the lowest-ranked teams in the draw and, by this stage, were also the last non-league clubs left in the competition.

Tie no	Home team	Score	Away team
1	Burnley (2)	3–1	Gillingham (2)
2	Liverpool (1)	2–1	Newcastle United (1)
3	Nottingham Forest (2)	0–3	Sheffield United (2)
4	Wolverhampton Wanderers (1)	1–3	West Ham United (2)
5	Luton Town (3)	0–1	Tranmere Rovers (3)
6	Everton (1)	1–1	Fulham (1)
replay	Fulham (1)	2–1	Everton (1)
7	Scarborough (5)	0–1	Chelsea (1)
8	Ipswich Town (2)	1–2	Sunderland (2)
9	Manchester City (1)	1–1	Tottenham Hotspur (1)
replay	Tottenham Hotspur (1)	3–4	Manchester City (1)
10	Northampton Town (4)	0–3	Manchester United (1)
11	Coventry City (2)	1–1	Colchester United (3)
replay	Colchester United (3)	3–1	Coventry City (2)
12	Portsmouth (1)	2–1	Scunthorpe United (4)
13	Arsenal (1)	4–1	Middlesbrough (1)
14	Birmingham City (1)	1–0	Wimbledon (2)
15	Telford United (5)	0–2	Millwall (2)
16	Swansea City (4)	2–1	Preston North End (2)

The match between Tottenham Hotspur and Manchester City was particularly notable. Tottenham led the match 3–0 at half-time but Manchester City turned the match around in the second half to win 4–3, with Jon Macken scoring the winning goal in the 90th minute. This was despite Manchester City having one less player on the pitch during the second half after Joey Barton was red carded during the half-time interval.

== Fifth round proper ==
- Matches played weekend of 14 and 15 February 2004
- Three replays played week commencing 22 and 25 February 2004.
- Four non-Premiership sides progressed to the quarter-finals.
- Division Two sides Colchester United and Tranmere Rovers were the lowest-ranked teams in the draw.

Tie no	Home team	Score	Away team	Attendance
1	Liverpool (1)	1–1	Portsmouth (1)	34,669
replay	Portsmouth (1)	1–0	Liverpool (1)	19,529
2	Sunderland (2)	1–1	Birmingham City (1)	24,966
replay	Birmingham City (1)	0–2	Sunderland (2)	25,645
3	Sheffield United (2)	1–0	Colchester United (3)	17,074
4	Tranmere Rovers (3)	2–1	Swansea City (4)	12,215
5	Fulham (1)	0–0	West Ham United (2)	14,705
replay	West Ham United (2)	0–3	Fulham (1)	27,934
6	Manchester United (1)	4–2	Manchester City (1)	67,228
7	Millwall (2)	1–0	Burnley (2)	10,420
8	Arsenal (1)	2–1	Chelsea (1)	38,136

== Sixth round proper ==
- Matches played on the weekend of Saturday, 6 March 2004.
- Two Division One sides progressed to the semi-finals, while another was eliminated at this stage.
- Division Two side Tranmere Rovers was again the lowest-ranked team in the draw and was only eliminated by First Division Millwall after a replay.
6 March 2004
12:30

Manchester United (1)	2–1	Fulham (1)
Van Nistelrooy 25', 62'	Report	Malbranque 23' (pen.)

Old Trafford, Manchester
Attendance: 67,614
Referee: Rob Styles

6 March 2004
18:00

Portsmouth (1)	1–5	Arsenal (1)
Sheringham 90'	Report	Henry 25', 50'; Ljungberg 43', 57'; Touré 45'

Fratton Park, Portsmouth
Attendance: 20,137
Referee: Jeff Winter

7 March 2004
13:00

Millwall (2)	0–0	Tranmere Rovers (3)
	Report

The Den, Bermondsey, London
Attendance: 16,404
Referee: Neale Barry

7 March 2004
16:05

Sunderland (2)	1–0	Sheffield United (2)
Tommy Smith 15'	Report

Stadium of Light, Sunderland
Attendance: 37,115
Referee: Steve Dunn

=== Replay ===
16 March 2004
19:45

Tranmere Rovers (3)	1–2	Millwall (2)
Jones 41'	Report	Cahill 11'; Harris 15'

Prenton Park, Tranmere, Birkenhead
Attendance: 15,510
Referee: Uriah Rennie

== Semi-finals ==
- Matches played on the weekend of Saturday, 3 April 2004.
- Two teams from Division 1 featured in the semi-finals (Millwall and Sunderland) who faced each other. The other tie was an all-Premiership affair between Manchester United and Arsenal, held at Villa Park.
- Both games were played at neutral venues.
3 April 2004
12:00

Arsenal (1)	0–1	Manchester United (1)
	Report	Scholes 32'

Villa Park, Birmingham
Attendance: 39,939
Referee: Graham Barber (Hertfordshire)

4 April 2004
13:00

Sunderland (2)	0–1	Millwall (2)
	Report	Cahill 26'

Old Trafford, Manchester
Attendance: 56,112
Referee: Paul Durkin (Dorset)

== Final ==
Manchester United won the game and lifted the trophy for the 11th time in their history (a competition record) with a 3–0 victory over a Millwall side who were the first team from outside the top flight to reach the FA Cup final in 12 years.

22 May 2004
15:00 BST

Manchester United	3–0	Millwall (2)
Ronaldo 43'; Van Nistelrooy 65' (pen.), 81'	(Report)

Millennium Stadium, Cardiff
Attendance: 71,350
Referee: Jeff Winter (County Durham)

== Media coverage ==
In the United Kingdom, the BBC were the free to air broadcasters for the third consecutive season while Sky Sports were the subscription broadcasters for the sixteenth consecutive season.

The matches shown live on the BBC were:

- Accrington Stanley 1-0 Huddersfield Town (R1)
- Burton Albion 0-1 Hartlepool United (R2)
- Southampton 0-3 Newcastle United (R3)
- Yeovil Town 0-2 Liverpool (R3)
- Liverpool 2-1 Newcastle United (R4)
- Manchester City 1-1 Tottenham Hotspur (R4)
- Sunderland 1-1 Birmingham City (R5)
- Arsenal 2-1 Chelsea (R5)
- Portsmouth 1-5 Arsenal (QF)
- Millwall 0-0 Tranmere Rovers (QF)
- Arsenal 0-1 Manchester United (SF)
- Manchester United 3-0 Millwall (Final)

The matches shown live on Sky Sports were:

- Thurrock 1-1 Luton Town (R1)
- Yeovil Town 4-1 Wrexham (R1)
- Canvey Island 2-3 Southend United (R1 Replay)
- Wycombe Wanderers 1-1 Mansfield Town (R2)
- Gravesend & Northfleet 1-2 Notts County (R2)
- Accrington Stanley 0-0 AFC Bournemouth (R2 Replay)
- Watford 2-2 Chelsea (R3)
- Leeds United 1-4 Arsenal (R3)
- Leicester City 1-3 Manchester City (R3 Replay)
- Scarborough 0-1 Chelsea (R4)
- Northampton Town 0-3 Manchester United (R4)
- Tottenham Hotspur 3-4 Manchester City (R4 Replay)
- Manchester United 4-2 Manchester City (R5)
- Liverpool 1-1 Portsmouth (R5)
- Portsmouth 1-0 Liverpool (R5 Replay)
- Manchester United 2-1 Fulham (QF)
- Sunderland 1-0 Sheffield United (QF)
- Tranmere Rovers 1-2 Millwall (QF Replay)
- Sunderland 0-1 Millwall (SF)
- Manchester United 3-0 Millwall (Final)
