= 1987 in Iceland =

- Decades: 1960s; 1970s; 1980s; 1990s; 2000s
- See also: Other events of 1987; Timeline of Icelandic history

The following lists events that happened in 1987 in Iceland.

== Incumbents ==
- President – Vigdís Finnbogadóttir
- Prime Minister – Steingrímur Hermannsson, Þorsteinn Pálsson

== Births ==
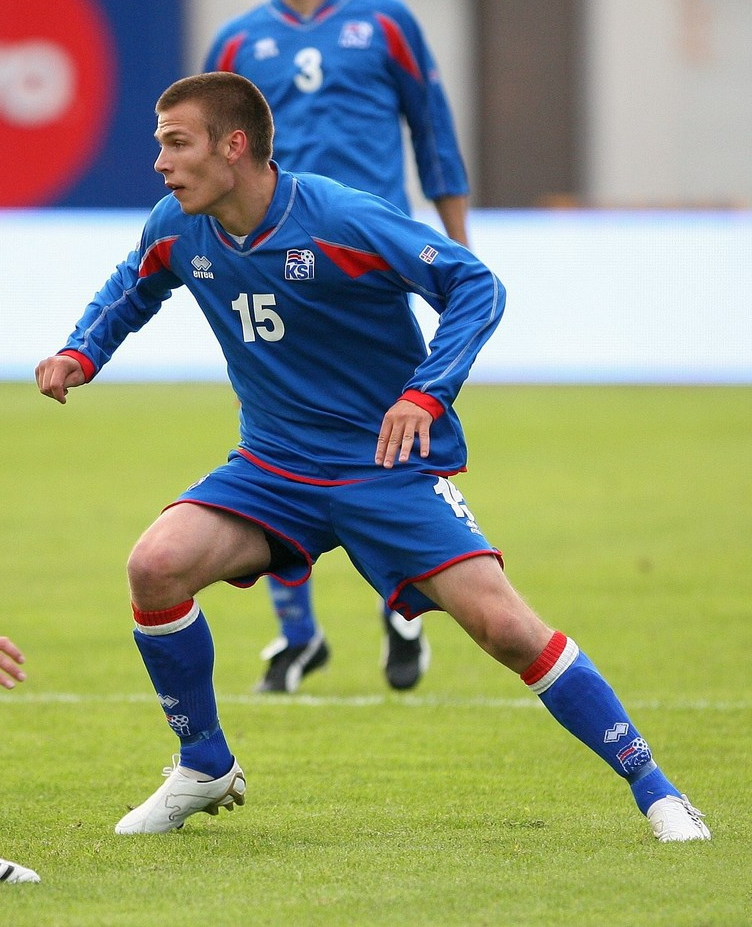
Theódór Elmar Bjarnason

- 30 January – Matthías Vilhjálmsson, footballer
- 4 March – Theódór Elmar Bjarnason, footballer
- 6 March – Ragnar Þórhallsson, musician
- 14 May – Ari Freyr Skúlason, footballer.
- 27 June – Katrín Ómarsdóttir, footballer

== Deaths ==
- 13 August – Guðmundur Ingólfsson, swimmer (b. 1929).
- 19 December – Guðmundur Ívarsson Guðmundsson, politician (b. 1909).
