= 1976 in Iceland =

- Decades: 1950s; 1960s; 1970s; 1980s; 1990s
- See also: Other events of 1976; Timeline of Icelandic history

The following lists events that happened in 1976 in Iceland.

== Incumbents ==
- President – Kristján Eldjárn
- Prime Minister – Geir Hallgrímsson

== Births ==
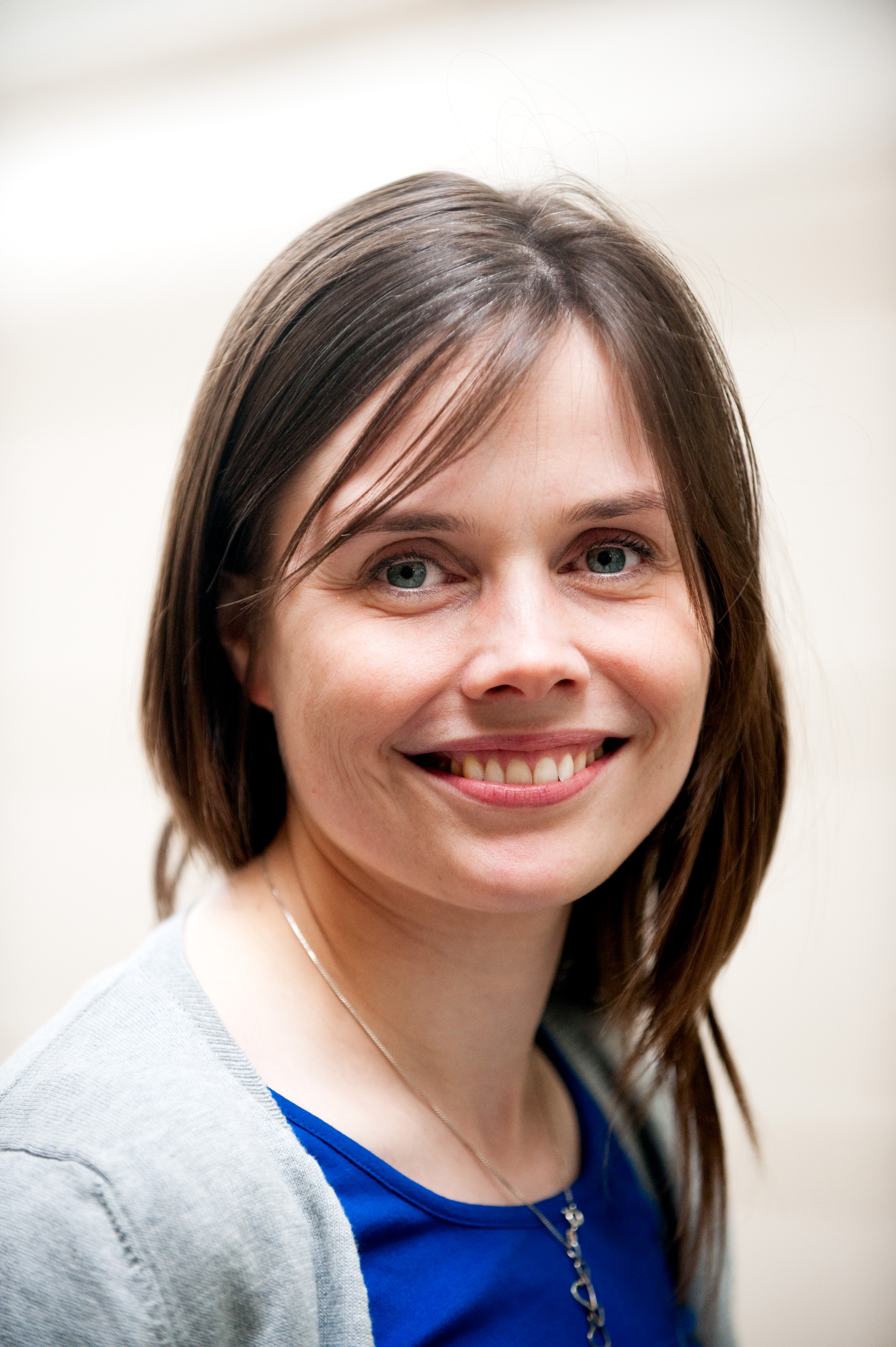
Katrín Jakobsdóttir

- 1 February – Katrín Jakobsdóttir, politician.
- 9 May – Ásthildur Helgadóttir, footballer.
- 30 May – Arna Lára Jónsdóttir, politician.
- 15 December – Jens Garðar Helgason, politician.
- 24 December – Sveinn Rúnar Sigurðsson, musician.

== Deaths ==
- 22 January – Hermann Jónasson, politician (b. 1896)
- 6 December – Magnús Brynjólfsson, alpine skier (b. 1923).
