= Tottenham Hotspur F.C. 3–4 Manchester City F.C. (2004) =

Tottenham Hotspur v Manchester City (2004)
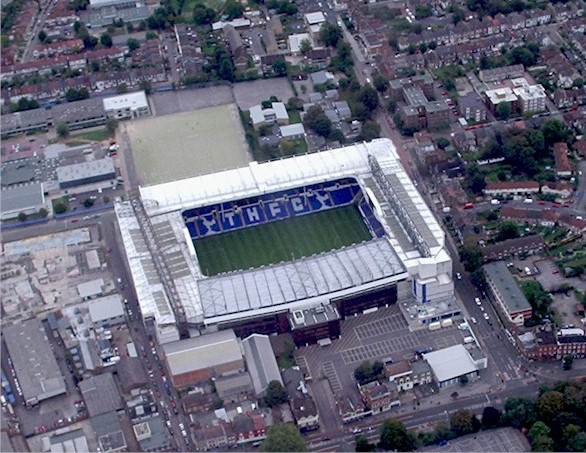
- Event: 2003–04 FA Cup fourth round replay
Tottenham Hotspur	Manchester City
3	4
- Date: 4 February 2004
- Venue: White Hart Lane, London
- Referee: Rob Styles (Hampshire)
- Attendance: 30,400
- Weather: Dry

In the Fourth Round of the 2003–04 FA Cup, the tie between Tottenham Hotspur and Manchester City went to a replay – played at White Hart Lane, London, on the evening of 4 February 2004 – after the original match 10 days earlier finished in a 1–1 draw.

Spurs took a convincing 3–0 lead into the half-time interval after goals from Ledley King, Robbie Keane and a Christian Ziege free kick. Having already seen their star striker, Nicolas Anelka, limp off with an injury in the 27th minute of the game, the situation was made even worse for City just before the half-time interval when key central midfielder Joey Barton was dismissed by the referee for dissent as both teams and the match officials were leaving the pitch at the end of the first half. However, after the break, goals from Sylvain Distin, Paul Bosvelt, Shaun Wright-Phillips and an injury-time strike from Jon Macken sealed victory.

In footballing circles, it is frequently referred to as one of the greatest comebacks of FA Cup history.

== Background ==
The match was played between two of English football's more notable clubs, at a time when both were experiencing lengthy periods of relative mediocrity. Neither team had finished higher than seventh in the Premier League since its creation more than a decade earlier. Manchester City had won promotion back to the Premier League just two seasons earlier, having spent just one of the previous seven seasons in the Premier League, and spending one season in Division Two. Furthermore, neither team had reached the final of the FA Cup since Spurs won the competition in 1991, although Spurs had won the Football League Cup five seasons earlier. City's last major trophy was the League Cup in 1976.

Being top division teams, both had entered the competition in the Third Round Proper, played in the previous month. Tottenham had advanced with an easy 3–0 victory over Crystal Palace while City had laboured to beat Leicester City, having been held to a replay after a 2–2 draw at home.

Being one of only three replays in the Fourth Round, it was already known that the winner of the match between the two teams would face Manchester United at Old Trafford in the Fifth Round.

== Match ==
=== Summary ===
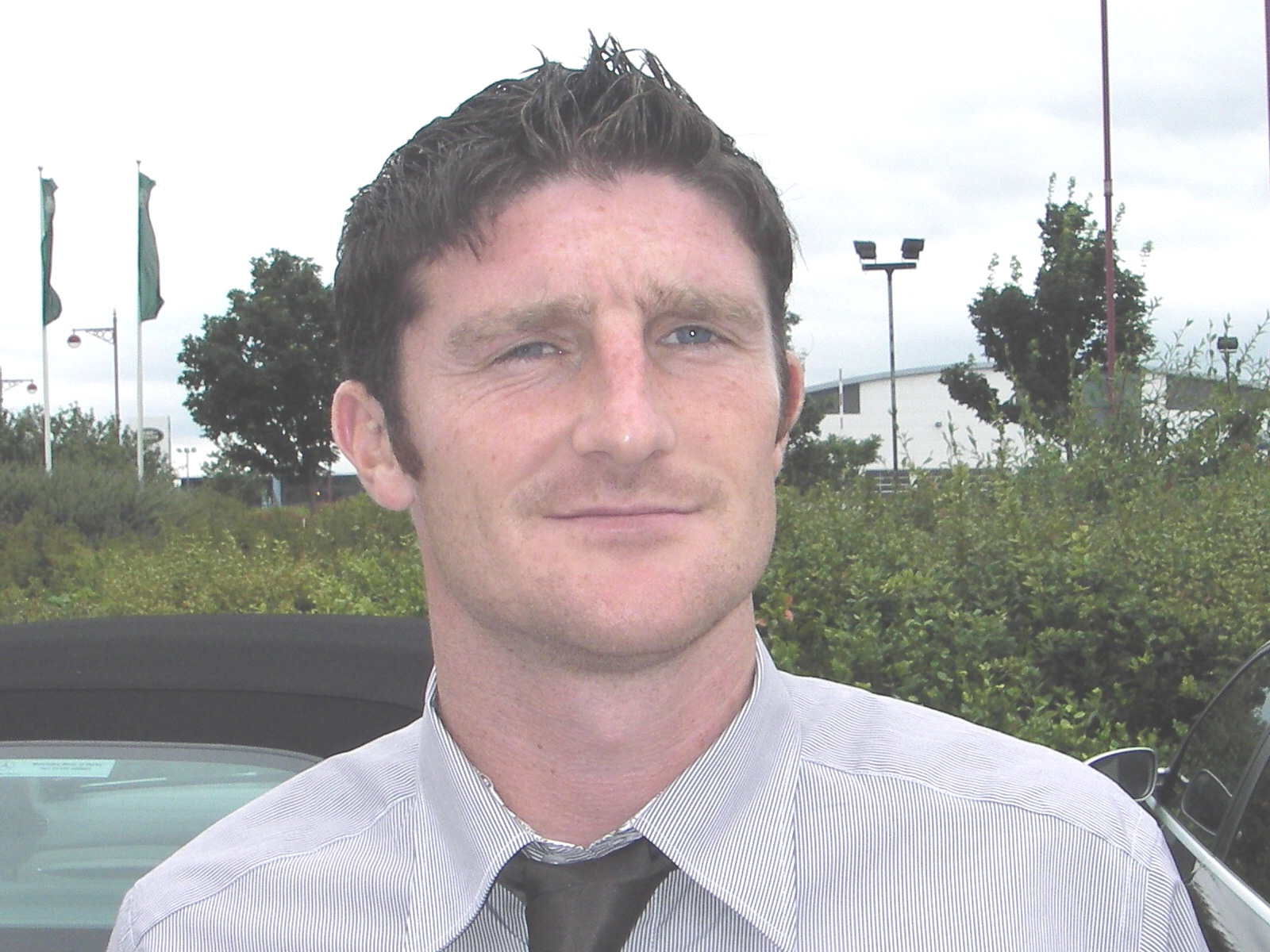
Jon Macken scored the winning goal for Manchester City.

Tottenham took the lead early in the match, their shot from outside the penalty area giving them a one-goal advantage after two minutes. However, their strong early position was knocked six minutes later when striker Hélder Postiga left the field with an injury, to be replaced by Gus Poyet.

In the 19th minute, Stephen Carr's long ball over the Manchester City defence was put past City goalkeeper Árni Arason by Robbie Keane, increasing Spurs' advantage to two goals. Less than ten minutes later, City themselves saw a striker substituted through injury when Nicolas Anelka incurred a hamstring strain in the 27th minute. His replacement was Jon Macken, who had been blamed for missing an open goal at the end of the previous match which had necessitated the replay be played in the first place. Spurs scored their final goal just before half-time as Christian Ziege took a free-kick caused by a Joey Barton foul on Michael Brown, in the process receiving a yellow card which would become far more relevant very shortly afterwards.

Barton's yellow card would come back to bite him on the stroke of half-time when, in a move which was indicative of the start of a career which would ultimately be characterised by controversy, he was reported to have remonstrated with referee Rob Styles as both teams made their way to the dressing rooms and promptly received a yellow card for dissent. His second yellow card resulted in his expulsion from the match and left his team with only ten men for the second 45-minute interval.

After the break, City appeared resurgent and scored within three minutes of the restart when defender Sylvain Distin headed in from a set piece. Reserve goalkeeper Arason — who was playing his first game in English football and who manager Kevin Keegan had never even witnessed in full match conditions before — then drew plaudits for a double save following another Ziege free kick. City reduced the lead to just one goal when Paul Bosvelt's half-volley took a deflection off Anthony Gardner in the 62nd minute.

Manchester City eventually drew level in the 79th minute when Shaun Wright-Phillips avoided an offside trap to lob Spurs goalkeeper Kasey Keller, and finally took the lead in the 90th minute as another cross from Michael Tarnat found Jon Macken, who prevented the need for extra time or penalties.

=== Details ===
4 February 2004

Tottenham Hotspur	3–4	Manchester City
King 2'; Keane 19'; Ziege 43'	Report	Distin 48'; Bosvelt 69'; Wright-Phillips 80'; Macken 90'

White Hart Lane, London
Attendance: 30,400
Referee: Rob Styles (Hampshire)

Tottenham Hotspur	Manchester City

GK	13	(United States) Kasey Keller
RB	2	(Republic of Ireland) Stephen Carr (c)
CB	36	(England) Dean Richards
CB	30	(England) Anthony Gardner
LB	23	(Germany) Christian Ziege	(substituted off) 60'
RM	29	(Wales) Simon Davies
CM	26	(England) Ledley King
CM	6	(England) Michael Brown
LM	11	(France) Stéphane Dalmat
CF	18	(Republic of Ireland) Robbie Keane
CF	8	(Portugal) Hélder Postiga	(substituted off) 9'
Substitutes:
GK	24	(England) Rob Burch
DF	34	(Republic of Ireland) Stephen Kelly
MF	14	(Uruguay) Gus Poyet	(substituted on) 9'
MF	28	(Republic of Ireland) Mark Yeates
MF	32	(England) Johnnie Jackson	(substituted on) 60'
Manager:
(England) David Pleat

GK	25	(Iceland) Árni Arason
RB	17	(China) Sun Jihai	(yellow card) 85'
CB	22	(Republic of Ireland) Richard Dunne
CB	5	(France) Sylvain Distin (c)
LB	18	(Germany) Michael Tarnat
RM	29	(England) Shaun Wright-Phillips
CM	24	(England) Joey Barton	(yellow card) 42' (yellow-red card) 45'
CM	26	(Netherlands) Paul Bosvelt	(yellow card) 78'	(substituted off) 80'
LM	28	(England) Trevor Sinclair		(substituted off) 80'
CF	39	(France) Nicolas Anelka		(substituted off) 27'
CF	8	(England) Robbie Fowler
Substitutes:
GK	32	(Denmark) Kevin Stuhr Ellegaard
DF	41	(England) Stephen Jordan
MF	10	(France) Antoine Sibierski		(substituted on) 80'
MF	20	(England) Steve McManaman		(substituted on) 80'
FW	11	(England) Jon Macken		(substituted on) 27'
Manager:
(England) Kevin Keegan

== Aftermath ==
City's victory was immediately heralded as a momentous event, with Kevin Keegan and commentator Alan Hansen both describing it as the greatest cup match they had ever witnessed. The following day, Guardian journalist Kevin McCarra labelled it "as great a comeback as English football has ever known" and the same publication was inspired to compare the match to previous challengers for the same mantle. Since then, it has regularly served as a benchmark for comparison when English teams have produced memorable cup turnarounds, and has featured on numerous media attempts to list the best cup matches in history.

Ultimately, Manchester City's heroics were in vain as they went on to lose their Fifth Round tie against bitter rivals Manchester United 4–2 in a tempestuous affair that saw Gary Neville sent-off for his part in a large melee in the 38th minute. United would go on to win the competition, defeating Millwall 3–0 in the final to claim their 11th FA Cup title.

For Spurs, losing the match did not seem to cause any lasting effects on their season, with the club continuing to record a similar number of wins and losses in their following matches as they had in the previous couple of months. For City, who had been on a winless run in the league stretching back to the start of November, the same originally appeared true as they picked up only one point from their next two matches before finally capping the winless run at 14 matches with an away victory over Bolton Wanderers on 21 February. This was followed-up with a 4–1 derby victory at the City of Manchester Stadium two matches later. Spurs, who had been four points ahead of City at the time of the FA Cup match, finished the season exactly the same distance ahead, with the teams finishing in 14th and 16th place respectively. Both teams had already been eliminated from all other competitions, with Spurs themselves having eliminated City from the League Cup.
