= 1977 in Iceland =

- Decades: 1950s; 1960s; 1970s; 1980s; 1990s
- See also: Other events of 1977; Timeline of Icelandic history

The following lists events that happened in 1977 in Iceland.

== Incumbents ==
- President – Kristján Eldjárn
- Prime Minister – Geir Hallgrímsson

== Events ==
- 18 December – Björk Guðmundsdóttir, then aged 11, releases her self-titled debut album Björk in Iceland on the Fálkinn record label, after a broadcast of her singing on RÚV, Iceland's national radio station, had led to a recording contract.

== Births ==
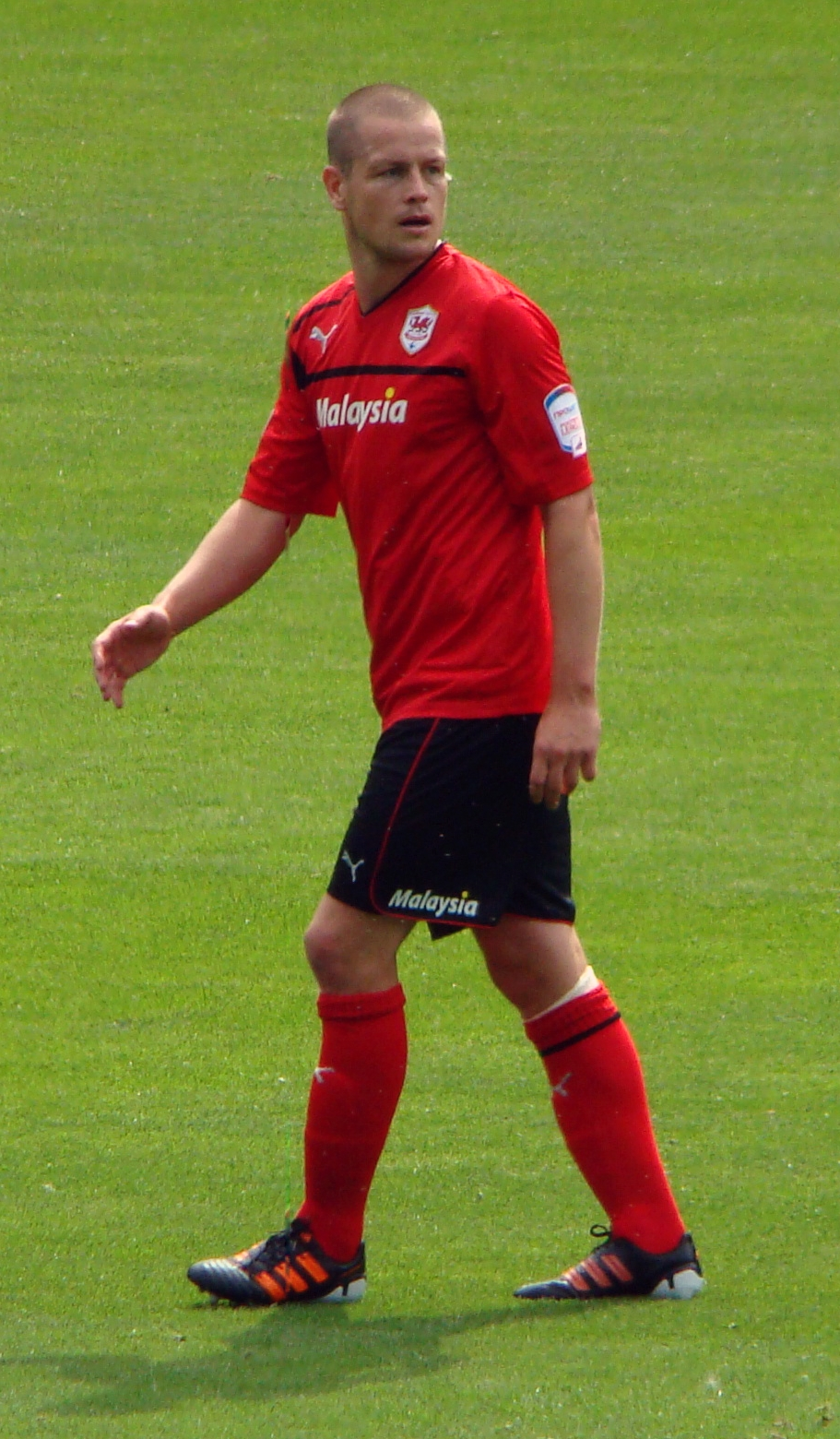
Heiðar Helguson

- 14 February – Ingibjörg Ólöf Isaksen, politician
- 25 March – Andri Sigþórsson, footballer.
- 16 May – Emilíana Torrini, singer and songwriter
- 10 June – Hugi Gudmundsson, composer
- 20 August – Ívar Ingimarsson, footballer
- 22 August – Heiðar Helguson, footballer
- 5 October – Hugleikur Dagsson, artist
- 16 May – Emilíana Torrini, singer and songwriter.

=== Full date missing ===
- Hössi Ólafsson, musician
