= Gunnlaugur Halldórsson =

Icelandic architect (1909–1986)

Gunnlaugur Halldórsson (1909–1986) was an Icelandic architect. He is considered the first Icelandic modernist architect. He was educated in Denmark.

Some of his works include the 1940 expansion of Landsbankinn, Háskólabíó (co-designed by Guðmundur Kr. Kristinsson) and the re-designed of Bessastaðir (the official residence of the President of Iceland) in the style of Danish manors. He designed the Sólheimar tower blocks in Reykjavík; the first of their kind.
