= Dóra Stefánsdóttir =

Icelandic footballer

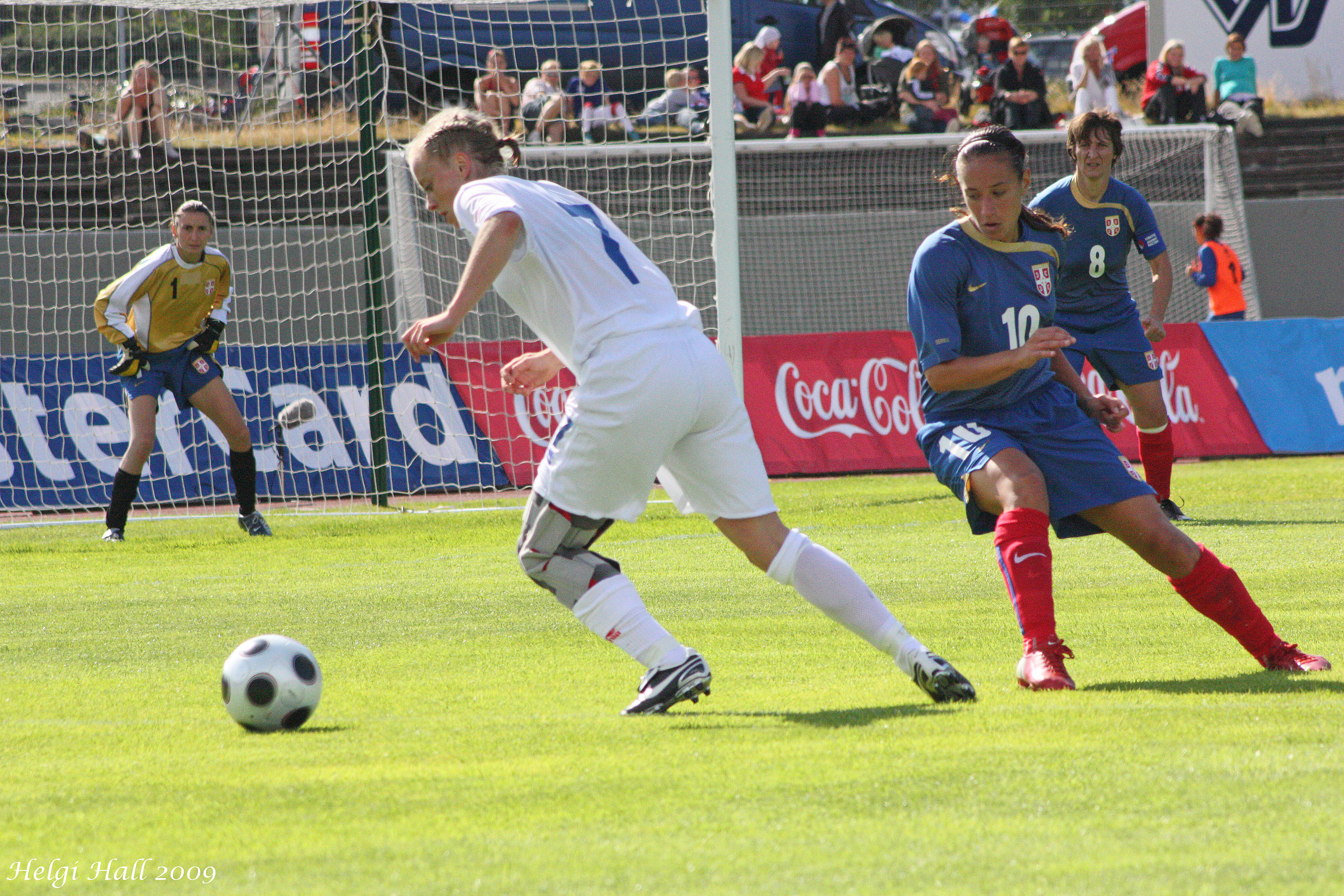
- Dóra (nearest the ball) versus Serbia in 2009

Personal information
- Full name: Dóra Stefánsdóttir
- Date of birth: 27 April 1985 (age 41)
- Place of birth: Iceland
- Position: Midfielder

Senior career*
| Years | Team | Apps | (Gls) |
| 2001–2005 | Valur | 64 | (21) |
| 2006–2010 | LdB FC Malmö | | |

International career^{‡}
| 2001–2002 | Iceland U-17 | 8 | (3) |
| 2001–2004 | Iceland U-19 | 18 | (4) |
| 2002–2005 | Iceland U-21 | 17 | (0) |
| 2002–2010 | Iceland | 47 | (3) |
- * Club domestic league appearances and goals as of 16 August 2009 ‡ National team caps and goals as of 31 March 2010

Dóra Stefánsdóttir (born 27 April 1985) is a retired Icelandic footballer who last played for Swedish club LdB FC Malmö. Dóra was part of Iceland's national team and competed in UEFA Women's Euro 2009. She retired in 2010 due to a knee injury.

She has captained the national youth teams, U-17, U-19 and U-21.

== Achievements ==
- Icelandic champion with Valur in 2004.
- Icelandic cup winner with Valur in 2001 and 2003.
