= Sesselja Sigmundsdottir =

- Born: Hafnarfjörður, Iceland
- Died: Reykjavík, Iceland

Sesselja (Hreindís) Sigmundsdóttir (5 July 1902 - 8 November 1974) was a noted Icelandic pioneer in the fields of pedagogy and the care for the mentally disabled and founder of the Sólheimar community.

After her training in education in Germany and Switzerland, where she was inspired by Rudolf Steiner, Sesselja returned to Iceland with the plan of establishing a self-sustaining community based on the anthroposophist philosophy. Here she would offer shelter and education to disabled and neglected children. At the age of 28, she acquired some land in a remote valley with its own hot spring and with the help of her family and friends built a farmhouse and named it Sólheimar - home of the sun.

== 2002 stamp ==
She has been recognised with a postage stamp issued in 2002 by Íslandspóstur. The stamp has a portrait of Sesselja and a picture of Sólheimar (Value 45 00 Scott 965).(An image of the stamp)

== Sources ==
- Michaelsdóttir, Jónína (1990) “Mér leggst eitthvað til:Sagan um Sesselju Sigmundsdóttur og Sólheima” Relief fund of Sólheimar
