= Alfreð Elíasson =

Icelandic businessman

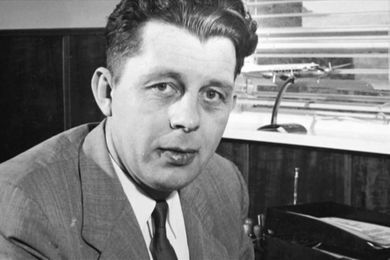
- Born: Alfreð Elíasson; 16 March 1920; Reykjavík
- Died: 12 April 1988 (aged 68); Reykjavík
- Occupations: Pilot and Manager
- Years active: 1944–1979
- Known for: Forming Loftleidir Icelandic

Alfreð Elíasson (1920–1988) was an Icelandic businessman who founded and served as president of Loftleidir.

Loftleiðir Icelandic Airlines was formed in 1944 with a single engine, three passenger plane of Stinson Reliant make, Loftleiðir grew to become one of the major carriers of the North Atlantic in the 1960s and early 1970s pioneering low-cost air travel over the Atlantic.

He has had his story made into a documentary film called Alfred Eliasson & Loftleiðir Icelandic made in 2009 in Iceland, which tells the story of the airline and Alfred, narrated in Icelandic by Arnar Jónsson.
