= Ásta Birna Gunnarsdóttir =

Icelandic handball player (born 1984)

Personal information
- Nationality: Icelandic
- Born: 29 October 1984 (age 41) Reykjavík, Iceland
- Height: 1.65 m (5 ft 5 in)

Sport
- Sport: Handball
- Position: Left wing
- Current club: Fram
- Number: 13

Senior clubs
- Years: Team
- 2002-2016: Fram
National team
Years	Team	Apps	(Gls)
–	Iceland	91	(107)
- Updated on 10 February 2024

Ásta Birna Gunnarsdóttir (born 29 October 1984) is an Icelandic former team handball player. She played on the Icelandic national team, and participated at the 2011 World Women's Handball Championship in Brazil, the 2010 European Championship in Denmark/Norway, and the 2012 European Women's Handball Championship in Serbia.

She played for entire career at Fram, where she won the Icelandic Women's Handball Cup in 2010 and the Icelandic Championship in 2013. She retired in 2016.
