= Andri Steinþór Björnsson =

Psychologist

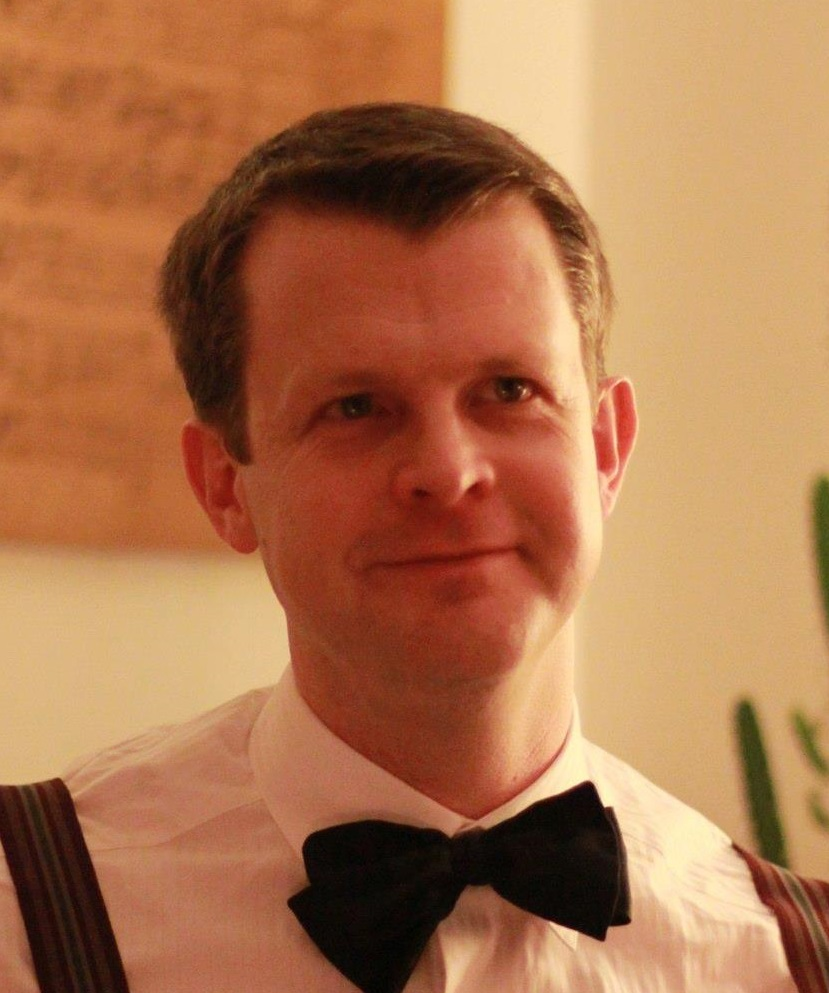
- Andri Steinþór Björnsson
- Born: January 11, 1973 (age 53)
- Education: University of Iceland; University of Colorado Boulder
- Scientific career
- Fields: Clinical psychology
- Workplaces: University of Iceland

Andri Steinþór Björnsson (born 11 January 1973) is a clinical psychologist and an associate professor of psychology at the University of Iceland. In addition to his work on body dysmorphic syndrome, he has hosted a series of radio programs on science and the scientific method broadcast by RÚV, as well as editing and writing books on science aimed at the general public.

== Education ==
Following his Bachelors and master's degrees in psychology at the University of Iceland in 1998 and 2003, Björnsson attended the University of Colorado Boulder where he wrote a master's thesis on depression amongst college students and received his PhD degree in 2009 based on his doctoral thesis, the topic of which was a randomized clinical trial employing cognitive behavioral group therapy. He worked as a clinical intern at McLean Hospital/Harvard Medical School where he developed an interest in body dysmorphic disorder, and joined a post-doctoral fellowship at the Warren Alpert Medical School of Brown University where he participated in clinical studies of body dysmorphic disorder.

== Writing ==
In addition to his published work on body dysmorphic syndrome and other research in psychology, Björnsson has written or edited two books aimed at a general audience on the history of science and the scientific method, and recently co-edited a book honoring the life and work of Vilhjálmur Rafnsson.

== Current work ==
Björnsson joined the faculty of the University of Iceland in 2011 as an associate professor, and was promoted to his current position as associate professor in 2014. His current research focuses on general anxiety disorders, social anxiety disorders, and panic disorders, with particular interest in obsessive and compulsive behavior within these disorders, in addition to his work on body dysmorphic disorder.

== Radio programs ==
In 1998, Björnsson hosted a seven part series on the "Most important scientific theories of our time" broadcast by RÚV, aimed at educating the general public on topics including the big bang theory, the theory of evolution, and the theory of plate tectonics.
