= Árni Gautur Arason =

Icelandic footballer

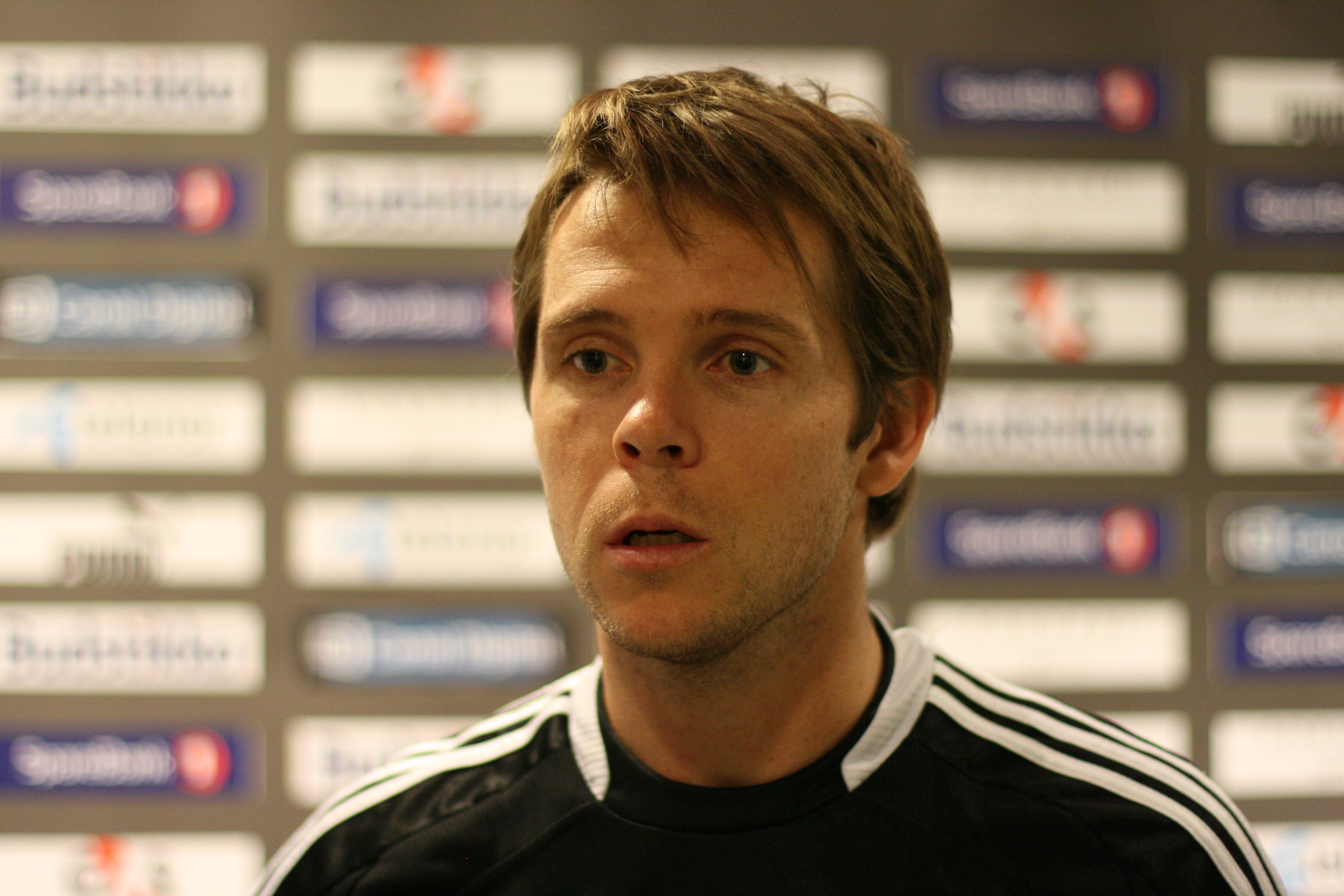
- Árni with Odd Grenland in 2009

Personal information
- Date of birth: 7 May 1975 (age 51)
- Place of birth: Reykjavík, Iceland
- Height: 1.87 m (6 ft 1 1/2 in)
- Position: Goalkeeper

Senior career*
Years	Team	Apps	(Gls)
1994–1996	ÍA	5	(0)
1997	Stjarnan	18	(0)
1998–2003	Rosenborg	81	(0)
2003–2004	Manchester City	0	(0)
2004–2007	Vålerenga	90	(0)
2008	Thanda Royal Zulu	6	(0)
2008–2010	Odd Grenland	62	(0)
2011	Lierse SK	2	(0)

International career
1990–1991	Iceland U-17	10	(0)
1992	Iceland U-19	3	(0)
1995–1997	Iceland U-21	11	(0)
1998–2010	Iceland	71	(0)
- * Club domestic league appearances and goals

Árni Gautur Arason (born 7 May 1975 in Reykjavík) is an Icelandic former football goalkeeper. Árni is also an educated lawyer from the University of Iceland.

== Club career ==
He played for Rosenborg between January 1998 and December 2003, also making several UEFA Champions League appearances for the club. After leaving Rosenborg, he had a brief spell at Manchester City in the spring of 2004, serving as understudy to David James, but only made two FA Cup appearances for the club.

In the first of these, against Tottenham at White Hart Lane, City found themselves 3–0 down at half time after an abject first half performance, and down to 10 men after Joey Barton had been sent off at the half time whistle. Following a Sylvain Distin header early in the second half, City were 3–1 down when Spurs won a free kick about 25 yards out. Christian Ziege had already beaten Árni from a similar distance in the first half, but this time Árni produced a stunning one handed tip onto the crossbar from a full stretch dive to his left. Gus Poyet could have headed the rebound into an open net, but Árni scrambled back to his right to save this effort too. A goal here would arguably have killed the game off, but after the double save City, went on to win 4–3.

He subsequently went on to join Vålerenga in 2004.

On 30 November 2007, Árni's contract expired and he left Vålerenga. In March 2008 he joined South African club Thanda Royal Zulu on a short contract, before moving back to Norway joining Odd Grenland in the summer the same year.

Árni retired in May 2012 after an operation on his elbow did not produce the results wanted.

== International career ==
He made his debut in an August 1998 friendly match against Latvia and was a regular for the Icelandic national team, earning in total 71 international caps. He did not feature in competitive matches for the national team after leaving Norwegian club Vålerenga in 2007, his last seven matches were all friendlies, with the last match being a 1–1 home draw against Liechtenstein in August 2010.

== Personal life ==
Árni grew up in the United States until the age of 9 when he moved to Akranes, Iceland.

In autumn 2005, Árni had a daughter with his girlfriend Sólveig Þórarinsdóttir.

After retiring from football, Árni started working as a lawyer in Norway.

=== Health issues ===
In October 2025, Árni revealed that he had been diagnosed with Huntington's disease 10 years prior.

== Honours ==
=== Club ===
Rosenborg BK

- Norwegian Premier League Champion: 2000, 2001, 2002
- Norwegian Football Cup Win: 1999

Vålerenga

- Norwegian Premier League Champion: 2005

=== Individual ===
Kniksen award as the Norwegian league's goalkeeper of the year in 2001 and 2005.
