= Una Guðmundsdóttir =

Icelandic educator and psychic

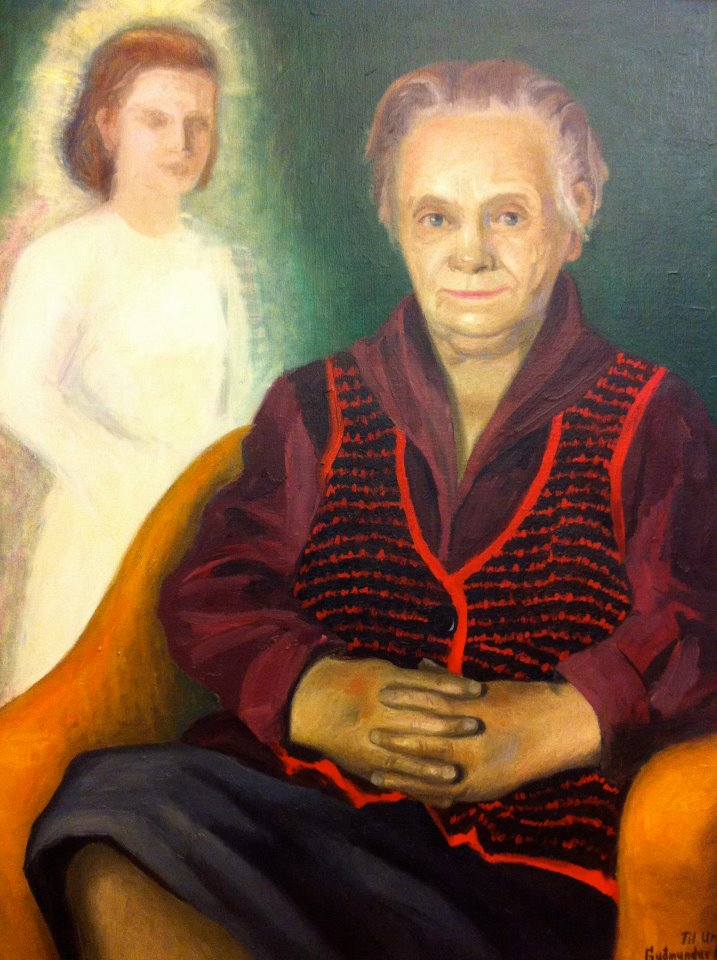
- Portrait of Una Guðmundsdóttir
- Born: 18 November 1894; Garður, Iceland
- Died: 4 October 1978 (aged 83)
- Occupation(s): Psychic, teacher

Una Guðmundsdóttir (18 November 1894 – 4 October 1978), known as Una í Garði (Una in Garður) and Una of Sjólyst, was an Icelandic educator and psychic.

Una Guðmundsdóttir was born in the schoolhouse in the town of Garður on 18 November 1894, the youngest of seven children of Guðmundur Jónsson and Guðríður Þórðardóttir. Her mother died in January 1895, when Una was about 8 weeks old. Una's father was drowned in March 1899, when Una was 4; she and her siblings were raised by Sigurlaug Sveinbjarnardóttir, and Una remained with her until her death in 1927 at the age of 82. In 1927, Una adopted Stefanía Guðríður Kristvinsdóttir (born 26 June 1926), who died suddenly on 10 August 1953, at the age of 27. Una said that Stefanía's death was the most difficult part of her life.

== Educational work ==
Una began teaching children when she was 16. At that time the minimum age for school in Iceland was 10 years. For decades, Una ran one of the first primary schools in the country, barnastúka Siðsemd nr. 14, as headmistress from 26 October 1934 to 11 December 1954, and after that as deputy head for another 12 years. She also taught older children who had trouble learning. The small house near the harbour in Garður where she lived became known as Sjólyst and she was often identified as 'Una of Sjólyst', although that was originally the name of a neighbouring house which has since been demolished. Because of her teaching, the house was also referred to as "the schoolhouse", and for a while the local library was housed there. She was also important in the local temperance movement and in producing plays.

== Psychic activities ==
At an early age Una became aware that she had psychic talents. She was said to have "connections with the otherworld" and became known as "the völva of Southern Peninsula", which was the title of a 1969 book by Gunnar M. Magnúss focussing on one of her experiences, which sold out in three weeks and made her nationally known; the book was reissued in 1979. Many people consulted her for advice. She had a reputation as a healer, once greatly helping a reporter with his bad back, and children brought injured birds to her to be nursed back to health.

== Legacy ==
Una's house was to have been demolished like those near it, but was bought and preserved. In November 2011 a group was formed to honour her memory, and they are restoring the house to turn it into a museum.

As of 2011, Guðmundur Magnússon was also working on a documentary about her.

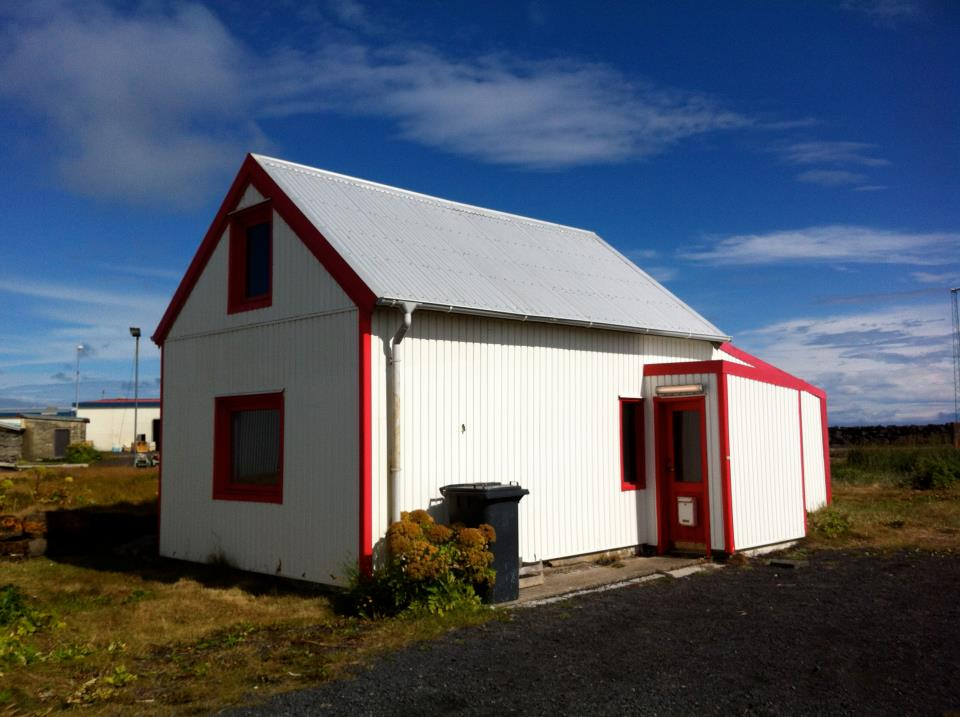
Una's house, Sjólyst, which is to become a museum.

== Bibliography ==
- Gunnar M. Magnúss. Völva suðurnesja: frásögn af dulrænni reynslu Unu Guðmundsdóttur í Sjólyst í Garði og samtalsþættir við hana. Reykjavík: Skuggsjá, 1969. OCLC 63213733 Repr. 1979. OCLC 17184289 (in Icelandic)
