= Sólheimar Ecovillage =

Ecovillage in Iceland

Coordinates: 64°04′07″N 20°38′35″W

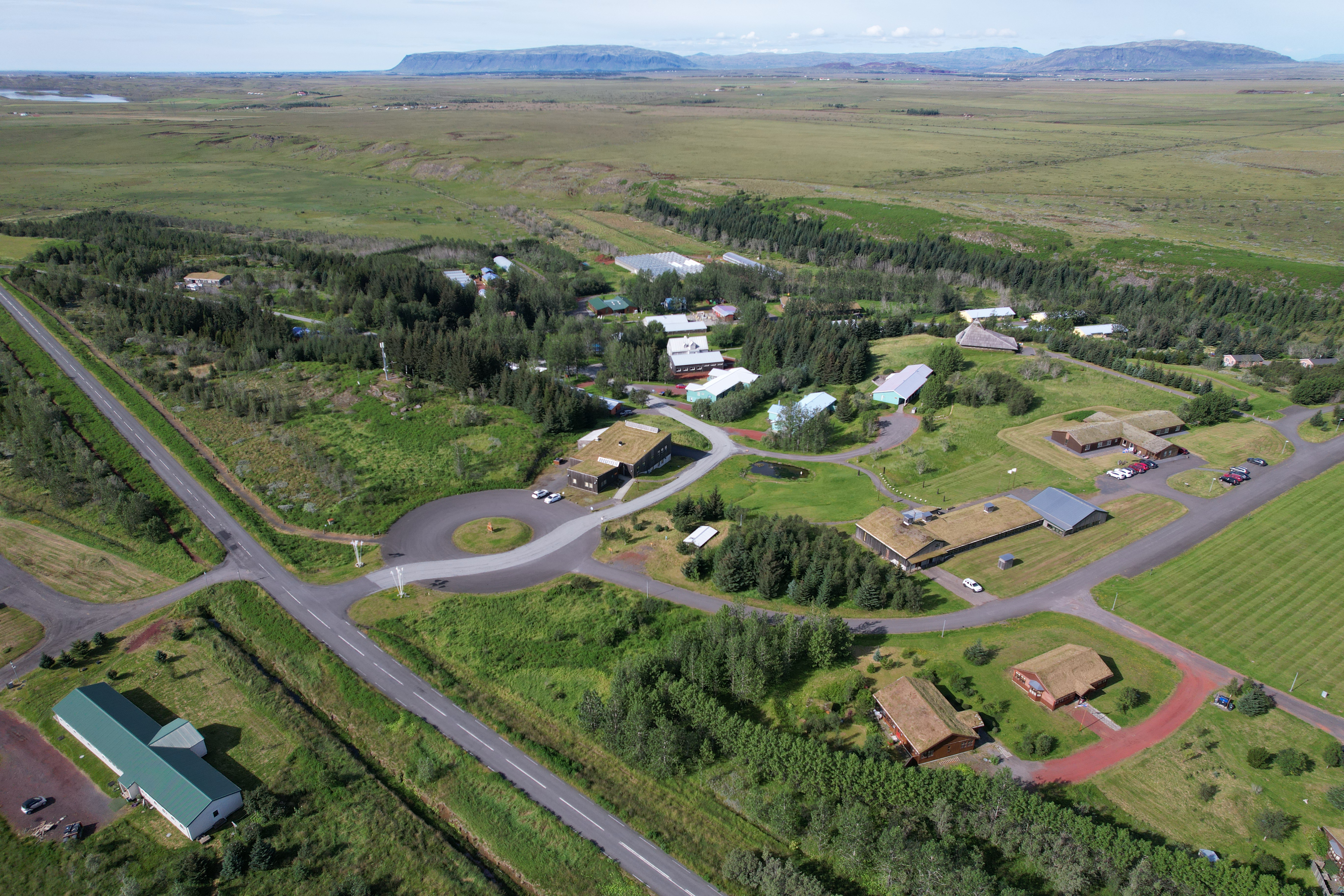
Areal view of Sólheimar

Sólheimar (Icelandic pronunciation: [ˈsoulˌheiːmar̥]) is an eco-village in Iceland and is renowned for its ecological, artistic, and international community ethics. Its current population size is about 100 people. The village of Sólheimar lies in the south-western part of Iceland, the municipality of Grímsnes- og Grafningshreppur. It is a community where people with or without special needs live and work together. Sólheimar is a pioneer of practising organic farming. In Sólheimar, there is an organically certified greenhouse, forestry, arboretum and egg production. Other environmentally friendly projects in Sólheimar include geothermal energy and recycling.

== History ==
Sólheimar (Sunworlds) was founded on July 5, 1930 by a pioneering woman: Sesselja Sigmundsdóttir (1902-1974). She was a paedagogical innovator who was specifically interested in caring for people with mental challenges as well as organic horticulture. In 1930, when Sesselja moved to Iceland, she kept in contact with other pioneers in organic farming and anthroposophy around Europe as the preparation proceeded to create a physical space where childcare could be achieved in a self-sustained community in a land with streams, hot springs and other natural surroundings.

On March 31, 1930, The childcare Committee of the Church of Iceland purchased the land known as Hverakot for isk 8,000. Sesselja leased the land and founded Sólheimar, which started out as a foster home on her 28th birthday, the 5th of July 1930 with the arrival of the first five foster children and at first they all lived in tents. In the fall of 1931, five children with mental challenges arrived in Sólheimar, while the first building, Selhamar, was constructed specifically for the developmentally disabled children in 1932 and 1933 with the support of Parliament. After World War II, besides Sesselja's foster children and the summer children, nearly all the children in Sólheimar had disabilities.

Today all activities in Sólheimar are based on Sesselja's lifework and visions: what started out as an isolated and primitive settlement in 1930 with around ten small children has now become a modern, self-supporting ecovillage with organic farming, thermal and solar energy and with a thriving cultural life. Inspired by the theories of Rudolf Steiner, Sesselja’s focus was the interaction between the individual and the environment. She was a passionate advocate for integrating children with and without disabilities, and it was here in Sólheimar where this vision was brought to life. She made a home for children in Sólheimar and focused her work on organic horticulture (the first in the Nordic countries), healthy food and artistic expression. Many of these ideas sparked controversy with the authorities because at the time, it was perceived that “healthy” children should not play with those with special needs. It was also viewed that the high-vegetable diet promoted by Sesselja was, in fact, not healthy for the children. Although Sesselja's proactive ideas were hard to accept, such disagreements have faded into history and the Sólheimar community continues to support a healthy lifestyle for everyone in the village.

== Ideology ==
The heart of the Sólheimar ideology is to give all individuals a fair chance and to maximise their potential. By focusing on individuals' possibilities instead of their limitations, Sólheimar aims to create the space for each resident to take every opportunity that arises for each person to grow and develop. Versatility is the strength of Sólheimar; so people with special needs that reside here will always be the centre of the community. This works through the idea of reverse integration: those without special needs adapt to the abilities of those who do; thus they can work together to make their community an equal and sustainable one. The foundation of the ideology of Sólheimar derives from the visions and lifework of Sesselja herself. Her life was strongly influenced by Icelandic reality in the beginning of the 20th century, the anthroposophical theories of Rudolf Steiner and Christian values.

== Sesseljuhús ==
On the 70-year anniversary of Sólheimar, July 5, 2000, Siv Friðleifsdóttir broke ground for the construction of Sesseljuhús, and announced the government's decision to provide 75 million ISK for the construction of the building. The project was completed on July 5, 2002, 100 years after the birth of Sesselja Sigmundsdóttur. The Sesseljuhús Environmental Centre acts as an example for sustainable buildings. It was designed and constructed with the goal of environmental sustainability, which took into account the origin, the production, and the recovery of any materials, specifically to Icelandic conditions. Nowadays, Sesseljuhús is wooden with a turf roof. Sesseljuhús is working in collaboration with national and international groups for environmental education and employment. In addition, the house is used as a community space (i.e. for watching films) for the residents of Sólheimar.

The founder of Sólheimar, Sesselja H. Sigmundsdóttir, was far ahead of her time in sustainability. Even today, Sólheimar is built to work on her ideals. The community emphasis is placed on organic farming and the use of natural and recyclable materials in workplaces. Sesseljuhús has an auditorium that can hold 100 people. It holds educational meetings, conferences and seminars on environmental issues for the public, schools, businesses, institutions, and unions. Sesseljuhús may also be rented out for public meetings and workshops.
