= 2023 in Nordic music =

The following is a list of notable events and releases that happened in Nordic music in 2023.

== Events ==
- 13 January – Rolling Stone lists Björk as the 64th-greatest singer and the 81st-greatest songwriter of all time.
- 13 January – The world premiere of the Sinfonia concertante of Esa-Pekka Salonen takes place at the NOSPR Concert Hall in Katowice, Poland, inaugurating the hall's new organ, with Iveta Apkalna as the soloist and the NOSPR conducted by the composer.
- 11 February – Faroese singer Reiley wins the 53rd Dansk Melodi Grand Prix at Arena Næstved and becomes Denmark's entry for the Eurovision Song Contest
- 25 February – Käärijä wins the 12th edition of Uuden Musiikin Kilpailu to become Finland's entry for the 2023 Eurovision Song Contest, with the song Cha Cha Cha.
- 4 March – In the final of Iceland's Söngvakeppnin, Diljá is selected to represent the country at the Eurovision Song Contest.
- 12 March – Tax evasion charges against members of Icelandic band Sigur Rós are finally dismissed.
- 13 May – Sweden's Loreen becomes the first woman to win the Eurovision Song Contest twice, having previously won in 2012. Finland's Käärijä finishes in second place.
- 9 June – It is confirmed that Petr Popelka will end his contract as chief conductor of the Norwegian Radio Orchestra after the 2022–2023 season.
- 22 September – Sweden's NorrlandsOperan confirms Eduardo Strausser as its next principal conductor and music director, effective from autumn 2024 for three seasons.
- 16 October – The Helsingborg Symphony Orchestra confirms Maxime Pascal as its next chief conductor, beginning in August 2024.
- October/November – Danish rock band Volbeat continue working on their ninth studio album, while lead vocalist Michael Poulsen undergoes throat surgery, which prevents the band from performing live shows in 2024.

== Albums released ==
=== January ===
Day	Album	Artist	Label	Notes	Ref.
13	Omen X	Turmion Kätilöt	Nuclear Blast Records		
13	Neon Noir	VV	Heartagram Records/UMG/Spinefarm		
20	4 (The Pink Album)	Lukas Graham	Warner Records		
20	Sky Void of Stars	Katatonia	Napalm Records		
20	Heroes of the Great War	Sabaton		Second in the “Echoes Of The Great War” EP trilogy	
20	At the Heart of Wintervale	Twilight Force	Nuclear Blast		
27	The Loss of All Hope	Ablaze My Sorrow	Black Lion Records	EP	
27	As in Gardens, So in Tombs	...And Oceans	Season of Mist		
27	Compositions	Deathprod	Smalltown Supersound		

=== February ===
Day	Album	Artist	Label	Notes	Ref.
10	Ad Astra	Aphyxion	Circular Wave		
10	Foregone	In Flames	Nuclear Blast	First album featuring US guitarist Chris Broderick	
10	Out of the Dark	Wig Wam	Frontiers Music		
17	Dance Devil Dance	Avatar	Thirty Tigers		
17	Heads Will Roll	Oceanhoarse			
24	Alttarimme on Luista Tehty	Azaghal	Immortal Frost Productions		
24	Anno 1696	Insomnium	Century Media	Based on a short story by vocalist Niilo Sevänen	
24	Double Decade	Märvel	The Sign Records	Compilation album	
24	Storm the Void/Starving Grave	Necrovation	Blood Harvest	EP	
24	Awake/Asleep	Sløtface		EP	

=== March ===
Day	Album	Artist	Label	Notes	Ref.
3	Heimdal	Enslaved	Nuclear Blast		
10	Anesidora	Isole	Cyclone Empire		
10	Fandens Kall	Tulus	Soulseller Records		
17	Ghost Town	Narnia			
17	Janne Schaffer & Herr Allansson Band - Live!	Janne Schaffer		Live album	
24	Fascination Street Sessions	Ihsahn	Candlelight Records	EP	
24	Once Upon a Time	Excalion	Scarlet Records		
24	Hatred Reborn	Hatesphere	Scarlet Records	Produced at Antfarm Studios	
24	Katharsis	Keep of Kalessin		Premiered on board The Freedom Of The Seas	
24	No Place Like Alone	Xysma	Svart Records	First album for 25 years	
31	Screem Writers Guild	Lordi	Atomic Fire Records	First album on Atomic Fire	
31	Apocalypse	Rotten Sound	Season Of Mist		

=== April ===
Day	Album	Artist	Label	Notes	Ref.
7	Hamartia	Tribulation	Century Media	EP	
14	Black Medium Current	Dødheimsgard	Peaceville Records		
14	Hunt the Flame	Magnus Karlsson's Free Fall	Frontiers Music		
21	Death of Darkness	The 69 Eyes	Atomic Fire Records		
21	River of Diamonds	Liv Kristine	Metalville Records	Tracks composed by Tommy Olsson	
21	It's Time to Rock the World Again	Magnus Rosén Band	X-World / Sound Pollution	Includes 5 bonus tracks	
28	Always on my Mind	Rebekka Bakken	Sony Music		
28	Beyond the Cenotaph of Mankind	Runemagick	Hammerheart Records		
28	Blómi	Susanne Sundfør	Bella Union		

=== May ===
Day	Album	Artist	Label	Notes	Ref.
5	Everything Destroys You	Deathstars	Nuclear Blast	First album for eight years	
5	Nostalgia	Enforcer		Recorded at Hvergelmer Studios and produced by the band	
5	Fremmede Toner	Lumsk	Dark Essence Records		
19	Phantomime	Ghost	Lorna Vista	EP	
26
26	War Against All	Immortal	Nuclear Blast		
26	Kalmah	Kalmah	Ranka Kustannus		
26	Outside the Rock Box	Magnus Rosén Band		Mini-album	
26	1977	Sirenia	Napalm Records		

=== June ===
Day	Album	Artist	Label	Notes	Ref.
2	Interference	Anubis Gate	No Dust Records		
2	Slasher	Omnium Gatherum	Century Media Records	EP	
9	Lullabies for Piano and Cello	Gabríel Ólafs	Decca Records US		
9	The Singularity (Phase II – Xenotaph)	Scar Symmetry		First album for 9 years	
16	The Storm Within	Saturnus	Nuclear Blast	Produced by Flemming Rasmussen	
16	Átta	Sigur Rós	BMG	First album for ten years	
23	Carry the Beast	Nocturnal Breed	Darkish Essence Information		
23	Bloodlines	Pyramaze	AFM Records		
23	Helvegr	Tsjuder	Season of Mist		
30	Stormbringers	Before the Dawn			

=== July ===
Day	Album	Artist	Label	Notes	Ref.
6	Du Måste Ta Ansvar	Ansvaret	NT Productions		
7	Slugs of Love	Little Dragon	Ninja Tune	Featuring Damon Albarn	
7	Tales from the North	Bloodbound	AFM/Soulfood	Concept album about Viking era	
14	We Shall Remain	Eleine	Atomic Fire Records		
21	The Age of the Offended	Cadaver	Nuclear Blast Records		
27	Last of a Kind	Panzerchrist	Emanzipation Productions	First album for ten years	

=== August ===
Day	Album	Artist	Label	Notes	Ref.
11	The Death of Randy Fitzsimmons	The Hives	Disques Hives	First album featuring bassist The Johan and Only	
11	Rocking Heels: Live at Metal Church	Tarja	earMUSIC	Live album	
18	The Vertigo Trigger	Cyhra	Nuclear Blast	Self-produced and mixed by Euge Valovirta	
18	Ýdalir	Skálmöld	Napalm		
18	Here for None	Warmen	Reaper Entertainment	Featuring Janne Wirman	

=== September ===
Day	Album	Artist	Label	Notes	Ref.
1	Club Romantech	Icona Pop	TEN Music Group/Ultra		
1	Memento Mori	Marduk	Century Media		
1	Memorial	Soen	Silver Lining Music		
1	Et hav av avstand	Taake	Dark Essence Records	All instruments played by Hoest	
8	Ending	Kvelertak	Nuclear Blast		
9	Live in Studio 3	Anna Mjöll			
15	Grand Explosivos	Electric Boys	Mighty Music		
15	Daemonic Rites	Mayhem	Century Media	Live album	
15	Sunholy	Shade Empire	Candlelight Records		
15	Shining	Shining	Napalm Record		
22	Soundtrack to the End of Times	Mercenary		Featuring Matt Heafy	

=== October ===
Day	Album	Artist	Label	Notes	Ref.
6	The Cancer Pledge	October Tide	Agonia Records		
13	Queen of Time (Live at Tavastia 2021)	Amorphis	Atomic Fire	Live album	
13	Heartbreakmiljonär	Oscar Zia	Sony	Digital download	
20	Spine	Myrkur	Relapse Records		
27	Reign of the Reaper	Sorcerer	Metal Blade Records		

=== November ===
Day	Album	Artist	Label	Notes	Ref.
3	Songs of the Dusk	Insomnium	Century Media Records	EP	
3	Die in Fire – Live in Hell (Agony and Ecstasy Over Stockholm)	Watain	Nuclear Blast	Live album recorded 7 October 2022	
10	Dark Christmas	Tarja Turunen	earMUSIC	Covers album	
17	Philosopher	Aeternus	Agonia Records	Recorded at Conclave & Earshot Studios	
17	Plague	Corroded	Despotz Records		

=== December ===
Day	Album	Artist	Label	Notes	Ref.
8	Inspiratio Profanus	Dimmu Borgir	Nuclear Blast Records	Covers album	
12	Vandrar	Gåte	Independent label	EP	
15	A Chapter Called Children of Bodom (The Final Show in Helsinki Ice Hall 2019)	Children of Bodom	Spinefarm	Live album	
15	Leviathan III	Therion	Napalm Records		
15	Trolldom	Troll	Polypus Records		

== Eurovision Song Contest ==
- Denmark in the Eurovision Song Contest 2023
- Finland in the Eurovision Song Contest 2023
- Iceland in the Eurovision Song Contest 2023
- Norway in the Eurovision Song Contest 2023
- Sweden in the Eurovision Song Contest 2023

== Classical works ==
- Anders Hillborg – Piano Concerto No. 2 (The MAX Concerto)
- Marcus Paus – The War Cross
- Esa-Pekka Salonen – Sinfonia concertante for organ and orchestra
- Anna S. Þorvaldsdóttir
  - Rituals (for string quartet)
  - Ubique'

== Film and television music ==
- Pessi Levanto – Superposition
- Peter Peter, with Peter Kyed, Cliff Martinez and Julian Winding – Copenhagen Cowboy

== Deaths ==
- 9 January – Magnar Mangersnes, Norwegian organist and choral conductor, 84
- 15 January – Doris, Swedish pop singer, 75
- 28 January – Odd Børre, Norwegian Eurovision singer, 83
- 23 February – Slim Borgudd, Swedish racing driver and drummer (Lea Riders Group), 76
- 8 March – Josua Madsen, Danish drummer, 45 (traffic accident)
- 1 April
  - Dario Campeotto, Danish-Italian singer Eurovision singer and actor, 84
  - Jack Vreeswijk, Swedish singer, song lyricist and composer, 59 (colon cancer)
- 7 April – Lasse Wellander, Swedish guitarist (ABBA), 70
- 1 May – Pugh Rogefeldt, Swedish musician and songwriter, 76
- 14 May
  - Garðar Cortes, Icelandic operatic tenor and opera director, founder of The Icelandic Opera, 82
  - Bernt Rosengren, Swedish jazz saxophonist, 85
- 20 May – Sven Nyhus, Norwegian folk musician, 90
- 2 June – Kaija Saariaho, Finnish composer, 70
- 4 July – Miki Liukkonen, Finnish writer and musician, 33
- 5 July – Ralph Lundsten, Swedish composer, 86
- 22 July – Knut Riisnæs, Norwegian jazz musician, 77
- 12 August – Berit Lindholm, Swedish operatic soprano, 88
- 15 August – Arnold Östman, Swedish conductor, 83
- 26 August – Bosse Broberg, Swedish jazz trumpeter and composer, 85
- 3 October – Harald Tusberg, Norwegian TV presenter, musician and songwriter, 88
- 19 October – Lasse Berghagen, Swedish singer-songwriter, 78
- 25 October – Hans Mosesson, Swedish actor, singer and songwriter, 79
- 19 November – Catherine Christer Hennix, Swedish polymath, 75
- 24 November – Jukka Haavisto, Finnish musician and music writer, 93
- 25 November – Yngvar Numme, Norwegian singer and actor, 79
- 6 December – Pedro Hietanen, Finnish musician and conductor, 74
- 20 December – Torben Ulrich, Danish polymath, 95
