= Valdimarsdóttir =

Valdimarsdóttir is a surname. Notable people with the surname include:

- Laufey Valdimarsdóttir (1890–1945), Icelandic women's rights activist
- Rósa Áslaug Valdimarsdóttir (born 1959), Icelandic footballer
- Unnur Anna Valdimarsdóttir (born 1972), Icelandic professor
