= Volcano tourism =

Visits to places centered around volcanic activity

Volcano tourism includes observing the flow of hot lava, hot springs and geysers, lava lakes, crater lakes, boiling ponds, rivers and hot mud pools during the volcano burst. Destinations include Iceland, Japan, Hawaii, Italy, and Indonesia.

== Background ==
Volcano tourism is a part of geotourism which includes events of flow of lava, hot springs and geysers, lava lakes, crater lakes, boiling ponds, hot rivers and boiling mud pools.

== Safety tips ==
Volcano tourism involves following safety tips:

- Detailed study on the place of visit
- Visit through a local guide who is licensed
- Understanding the route for exit

== Popular destinations ==
- Iceland - Iceland's Reykjanes Peninsula, which has experienced multiple eruptions since 2021, is among the world's most accessible active volcanic destinations. Since March 2025, visitors can also experience Volcano Express, an indoor cinematic simulator ride inside Harpa Concert Hall in Reykjavík that recreates the volcanic landscapes using motion seating and multisensory effects, operating year-round, regardless of weather conditions.
- Costa Rica - Arenal Volcano is an active andesitic stratovolcano in northwestern Costa Rica near Lake Arenal. It was once of the countries most active volcanos from 1968 until a decline in eruptive activity beginning in 2010. It is part of Arenal Volcano National Park.
- Mount Vesuvius, Italy

== See also ==
- Volcanic eruptions
