= Garðar Cortes =

Icelandic singer (1940–2023)

- Born: 24 September 1940; Reykjavík, Kingdom of Iceland
- Died: 14 May 2023 (aged 82); Reykjavík, Iceland
- Education: Royal Academy of Music (1968); Watford School of Music (1969)
- Occupation: Opera singer (tenor)

Garðar Emanúel Axelsson Cortes (24 September 1940 – 14 May 2023) was an Icelandic singer, choir director, orchestra director, and opera director who founded the Icelandic Opera, the Reykjavík School of Singing, and the Reykjavík Symphony Orchestra.

Born in Reykjavík, Garðar Cortes began advanced music studies in London in 1963. He studied singing, orchestral and choral conducting, as well as music pedagogy, at the Royal Academy of Music and Trinity College of Music. He graduated in 1969 and shortly thereafter returned to Iceland. Initially he was a music school director in Seyðisfjörður, but soon moved back to Reykjavík. There, he conducted the Fóstbræður Male Choir, and directed music at the Icelandic National Theater, including performances of Zorba the Greek, Oklahoma!, and Cabaret.

In 1973, he founded the Reykjavík School of Singing (Söngskólinn í Reykjavík) and was its principal for more than 40 years. He founded the Icelandic Opera and was its director from 1980 to 1999, also performing many of the key tenor roles on stage.

Garðar Cortes received many honors and recognitions for his work in music. He was made a Commander of the Order of the Falcon by the President of Iceland in 1990. In 2017, he received the honorary lifetime award at the Iceland Performing Arts Awards, for his contribution to performing arts and music in Iceland.

Garðar Cortes was the father of Garðar Thór Cortes. He died on 14 May 2023, at the age of 82.
