= Sarang Seohyun Kim =

South Korean violinist (born 2008)

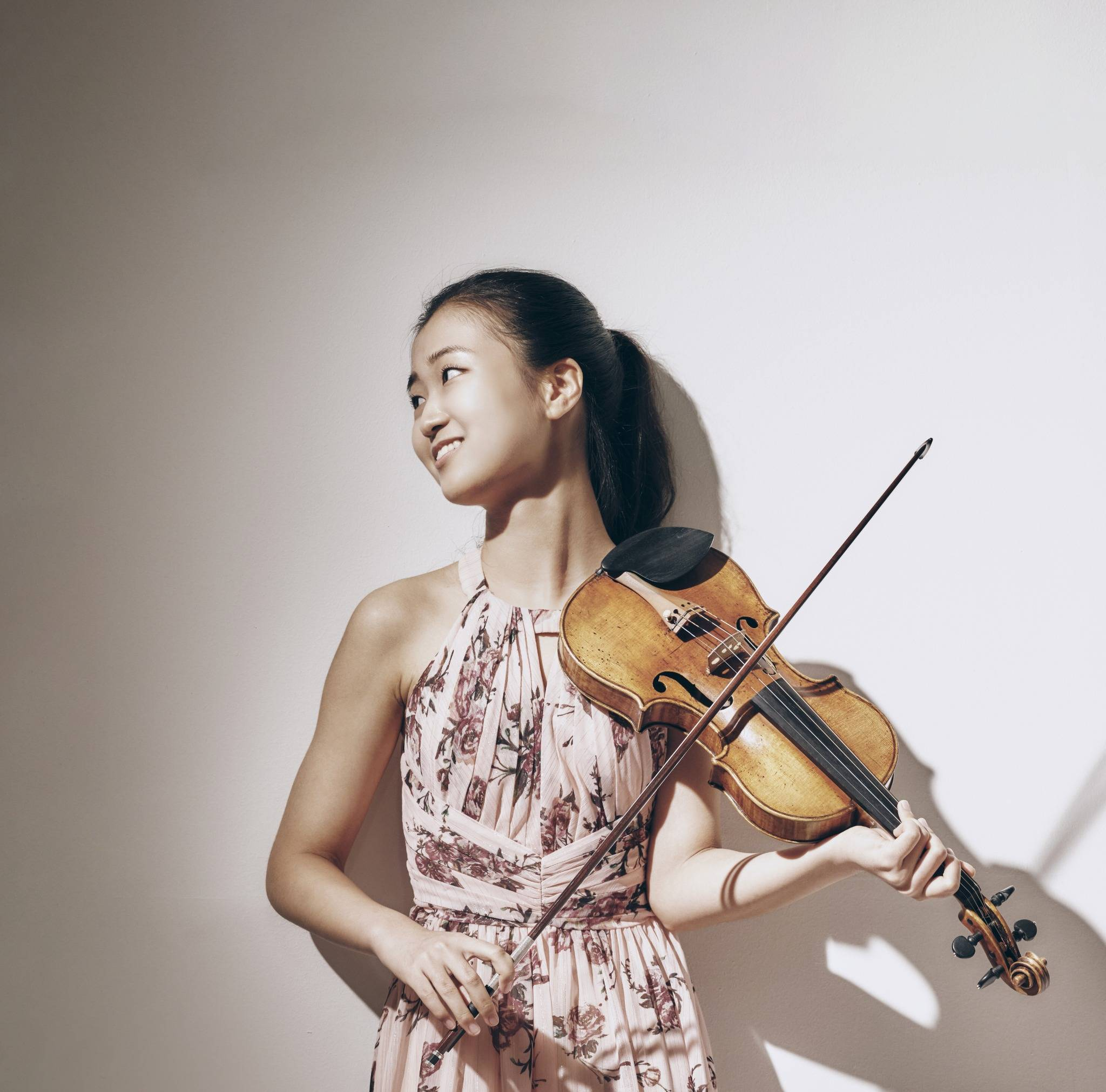
- Sarang Seohyun Kim
- Born: Seohyun Kim; 14 October 2008 (age 18); Seoul, South Korea
- Education: Kronberg Academy
- Occupation: Violinist
- Years active: 2023–present
- Musical career
- Genre: Classical
- Instrument: Violin
- Label: HarrisonParrott

Korean name
- Hangul: 김서현
- RR: Gim Seohyeon
- MR: Kim Sŏhyŏn

"Sarang" Seohyun Kim (Korean: 김서현; born 14 October 2008) is a South Korean violinist who won the 2023 Tibor Varga International Competition at 14 years old. She is currently studying as a young soloist at the Kronberg Academy under Mihaela Martin, and her general management is handled by HarrisonParrott.

== Life and education ==
Kim was born in 2008 in Seoul, South Korea. She previously studied with Sunny Lee at the Seoul Central Conservatory and at Yewon School in South Korea, and is currently studying as a young soloist at the Kronberg Academy under Mihaela Martin.

== Career ==
Kim plays a 1753 G.B. Guadagnini violin, loaned to her by the Tibor Varga's family. She receives support from the DAEWON Cultural Foundation and Aju Group, and is a Larsen Strings Artist.

In 2024, Kim released the album "Young Musicians of Korea 2024", organized by the Korean Broadcasting System.

=== Orchestral performances ===
Kim performed with the Seoul Philharmonic Orchestra at its New Year's Concert, conducted by Jaap van Zweden, in 2025. In 2026, she made her debut with the WDR Sinfonieorchester at the Cologne Philharmonie under Andris Poga, alongside cellist Daniel Müller-Schott, and undertook a tour of Germany and Korea. She also performed with the Academy of St Martin in the Fields at the Tonhalle Zurich as an Orpheum Foundation Young Soloist. Other recent orchestral engagements have included the Estonian National Symphony Orchestra in Tallinn, Hungary's Pannon Philharmonic Orchestra at Müpa Budapest under Gilbert Varga, the Lithuanian Chamber Orchestra, the Basque National Youth Orchestra, the Canton Symphony Orchestra in Ohio, and the Wisconsin Philharmonic Orchestra. In South Korea, she has performed with several orchestras, including the Seoul Philharmonic Orchestra, the Korean National Symphony Orchestra, the KBS Symphony Orchestra, and the Gyeonggi Philharmonic Orchestra, among others.

=== Recitals and chamber music ===
Kim has given recitals at the Tongyeong International Music Festival, the Kumho Rising Star Concert, the Gstaad Menuhin Festival, and the Dame Myra Hess Series in Chicago. In 2025, at age 16, she performed a recital of the complete Ysaÿe solo violin sonatas. She has also been active in chamber music, performing with Gidon Kremer, Miklós Perényi, and Lawrence Power as part of the Kronberg Academy's "Chamber Music Connects the World" series, and with Daishin Kashimoto, Alessio Bax, Clara-Jumi Kang, and Sunwook Kim at the Incontri in Terra di Siena festival. As an Orpheum Foundation Young Soloist, she has also played chamber music with Julia Fischer.

== Awards ==
- First Prize, Ysaÿe International Music Competition, 2021.
- First Prize, Thomas and Evon Cooper International Competition, 2022 — the youngest winner, at age 13.
- First Prize, Tibor Varga International Competition, 2023 — the youngest-ever winner, at age 14.
- New Artist Prize at the DAEWON Cultural Foundation Music Awards, 2026
