= Hallfríður Ólafsdóttir =

Icelandic flautist, music pedagogue, and writer (1964–2020)

- Born: 12 July 1964; Reykjavík, Iceland
- Died: 4 September 2020 (aged 58); Reykjavík, Iceland
- Education: Kvennaskólinn í Reykjavík
- Alma mater: Royal Academy of Music; Royal Northern College of Music
- Occupations: Flautist; Music pedagogue; Writer
- Years active: 1992–2020
- Organization: Iceland Symphony Orchestra
- Spouse: Ármann Helgason
- Children: 2

Hallfríður Ólafsdóttir (12 July 1964 – 4 September 2020) was an Icelandic flautist, music pedagogue and writer. She did chamber music for the Iceland Symphony Orchestra, conducted orchestra with several symphony orchestras and was a flute teacher at various Icelandic institutions. Hallfríður collaborated in the creation of the mouse Maximus Musicus to introduce children to classical music. She received multiple awards and recognition for her work and was appointed Knight's Cross of the Icelandic Order of the Falcon in 2014.

== Early life and education ==
Hallfríður was born on 12 July 1964 in Reykjavík. She was brought up in Kópavogur. Hallfríður was educated at Kársnesskóli in Kópavogur and Kvennaskólinn í Reykjavík. She was a graduate of Reykjavík High School and each of the Reykjavík Academy of Music with a degree for being a brass teacher and a soloist in mid-1988 under Bernharður Wilkinson, the Royal Academy of Music with a Diploma of Advanced Studies under William Bennett, and the Royal Northern College of Music with a post-graduate diploma. Hallfríður received private tutoring in French music in Paris under Alain Marion between late 1991 and early 1992.

== Career ==
She returned to Iceland following graduation to become a flautist and teacher in Reykjavik. Hallfríður took part in chamber music for the Iceland Symphony Orchestra mainly with her foundation of the chamber group Camerarctica. She served as a flute teacher at Reykjavík Music School, educated at the Royal Academy of Music, and recorded works by Wolfgang Amadeus Mozart as well as Icelandic chamber works, which she released on CD. Hallfríður was the Iceland Symphony Orchestra's leading flautist for more than two decades and performed in solo concerts with it. She also taught flute music at Menntaskóli í tónlist, Tónlistarskóli Garðabæjar and the Iceland University of the Arts. Hallfríður conducted the Icelandic Amateur Symphony Orchestra (Sinfóníuhljómsveit áhugamanna), the Young Peoples' Symphony Orchestra (Sinfóníuhljómsveit unga fólksins), the North Iceland Symphony Orchestra, the East Iceland Symphony Orchestra, as well as smaller groups like the Icelandic Flute Choir. She trained woodwind instruments in the youth departments of symphony orchestras such as the Iceland Symphony Youth Orchestra.

Hallfríður authored and served as artistic director in collaboration with the illustrator and violinist Þórarinn Már Baldursson, the Iceland Symphony Orchestra, Ríkisútvarpið and Forlagið on an educational project concerning a mouse, which was called Maximus Musicus, to introduce children to classical music. The five children's books called Maxímús Músíkús heimsækir hljómsveitina (2008), Maxímús Músíkús trítlar í tónlistarskólann (2010), Maxímús Músíkús bjargar ballettinum (2012), Maxímús Músíkús kætist í kór (2014) and Maxímús Músíkús fer á fjöll (2017) were published in eight languages and more than 100 concerts based on the stories have staged by symphony orchestras worldwide. In February 2020, Hallfríður conducted a concert of orchestral music by women composers that had previously been neglected, including Fanny Mendelssohn, Emilie Mayer, and Alice Mary Smith.

In 2002, Hallfríður was made an Honorary Associate of the Royal Academy of Music in London. The following year, she received the title of Town Artist of Garðabær. She was nominated for The Society Award of Fréttablaðið in 2010. In 2014, Hallfríður was awarded the Knight's Cross of the Icelandic Order of the Falcon, for "her contribution towards musical education of children". In early 2017, Hallfríður was nominated for the Pioneer of the Year (Eldhugi ársins) by the Rotary Club of Kópavogur. She received the Icelandic President's Honorary Export Award in 2019, for "her unique contribution to increasing Iceland's reputation abroad." That same year, she won the Young Audiences Music Award. In June 2020, Hallfríður received honorary recognition from Garðabær "for her important contribution to culture and the arts."

== Personal life ==
Hallfríður was a member of the independent Kvennakirkja group of the Church of Iceland. She was married to the musician Ármann Helgason, with whom she had two children. On the evening of 4 September 2020, she died of cancer in the emergency department at the Landspítali.
