= Nonni and Manni =

- Nonni and Manni DVD cover (German)
- Written by: Joshua Sinclair
- Directed by: Ágúst Guðmundsson
- Starring: Garðar Thór Cortes; Einar Örn Einarsson; Stuart Wilson; Lisa Harrow; Concha Hidalgo; Luc Merenda; Klaus Grünberg; Sverre Anker Ousdal
- Theme music composer: Klaus Doldinger
- Opening theme: "Ocean"
- Composer: Klaus Doldinger
- Countries of origin: Iceland, West Germany
- Original language: English
- No. of seasons: 1
- No. of episodes: 6

Production
- Executive producer: David Conroy
- Producer: Petter J. Borgli
- Production locations: Iceland, Norway
- Cinematography: Tony Forsberg
- Editor: Gisela Haller
- Running time: approx. 52 min

Original release
- Network: ZDF
- Release: 26 December 1988 – 1 January 1989

Nonni and Manni is an adventure children's television series produced as a joint venture between Iceland and West Germany. The six-episode series debuted on 26 December 1988 on West Germany's ZDF channel, with the last one airing on 1 January 1989.

The story was based on the eponymous book written by the popular Icelandic children's author Jón Sveinsson, nicknamed "Nonni", who had written several books inspired by his own experiences of growing up alongside his brother Ármann, nicknamed "Manni", at their childhood home in Akureyri. The filming for the series took place in Iceland, West Germany and Norway.

== Plot ==
Twelve-year-old Nonni (Garðar Thór Cortes) and his eight-year-old brother Manni (Einar Örn Einarsson) live with their mother Sigrid (Lisa Harrow) and grandmother (Concha Hidalgo) on a small farm in 1869 Iceland. Before Manni was even born, the boys' father had gone to South America in search of work to support his family, and they are still awaiting his return.

A stranger by the name of Harald Helgasson (Luc Merenda) appears in town one day. He presents himself as the boys' father's best friend and informs them that their father had died of a fever. Before he died, he made Harald promise he would return to Iceland to look after his family. Harald helps the family by working on the farm and becomes a close friend to the boys who immediately take a liking to Harald and start to see him as a father figure.

Magnus Hansson (Stuart Wilson) is a local businessman who is in love with Sigrid and has been trying to convince her to marry him. Magnus dislikes Harald due to the close relationship that Harald has been developing with the family and starts becoming increasingly upset over this. When another rich local businessman is killed, Magnus accuses Harald of murder. Upon the advice of the family, Harald flees into the mountains and hides from the authorities while Nonni and Manni, who firmly believe in Harald's innocence, expose themselves to danger and adventure while trying to keep Harald safe and prove him innocent.

== Filming ==
Filming mostly took place in Snæfellsnes in western Iceland. A farm was built in Hraunsfjörður as the home of Nonni and Manni. Flatey served as the 19th century version of Akureyri. The hiding place of Harald was an unnamed waterfall in Þingmannaá in Westfjords. The iconic hole in the mountain is located in Dimmuborgir.
