= Jasper Parrott =

British businessman and music manager

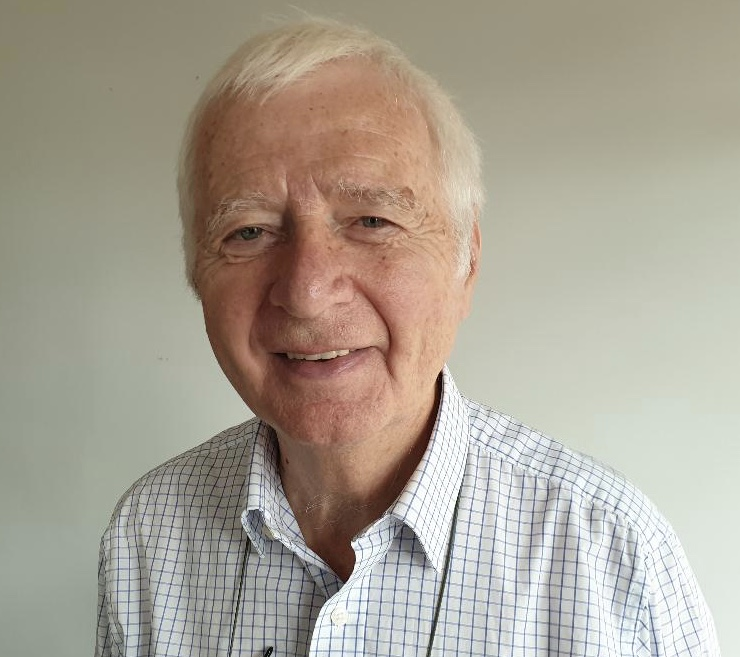
- Parrott in 2019
- Born: September 8, 1944 (age 81); Stockholm, Sweden
- Education: Tonbridge School
- Alma mater: Peterhouse, Cambridge
- Occupations: Artist manager, executive chairman
- Years active: 1960s–present
- Employer: HarrisonParrott Ltd
- Known for: Co-founder of HarrisonParrott
- Spouse: Cristina Ortiz (m. 1974)
- Children: 2
- Parent: Sir Cecil Parrott (father)
- Awards: Artist Manager of the Year (2015); Knight First Class of the Order of the White Rose of Finland (2020)
- Website: www.harrisonparrott.com

Jasper Parrott (born 8 September 1944 in Stockholm) is the co-founder and executive chairman of HarrisonParrott Ltd. Based in London, Munich and Paris, the artist management company is credited with pioneering innovative methods of handling the careers of classical musicians. HarrisonParrott's approach (also embracing orchestral and project management) has been widely influential within the artist management business worldwide.

In 2015, Parrott was named 'Artist Manager of the Year' at an Association of British Orchestras/Rhinegold awards ceremony.

In 2020, Parrott was awarded the decoration of the Knight First Class of the Order of the White Rose of Finland (FWR K I) for his long-term commitment to Finland, achievements in enriching Finnish music life and his successful hard work in promoting Finnish artists abroad.

== Career ==
Parrott's artist management career began in the 1960s at the London-based Ibbs and Tillett Ltd concert agency. In 1969 Parrott and an Ibbs & Tillett colleague, Terry Harrison, departed to form HarrisonParrott Ltd. Among the musicians previously or currently managed by HarrisonParrott are Kent Nagano, Karita Mattila, Lisa Batiashvili, Jean-Yves Thibaudet, Patricia Kopatchinskaja, Susan Bullock, Vladimir Ashkenazy, Anne Sofie von Otter, Stephen Hough, Kyung-wha Chung and Krzysztof Penderecki.

Parrott has played a prominent role in the creation of a series of international arts and cultural events. Among these have been: the London Japan Festival (1991); the Festival of Switzerland in Britain (also 1991); the Boulez Festival in Tokyo (1995); and a Festival of Turkish Arts in Berlin (2004). As a consultant, Parrott has acted for the Schleswig-Holstein Music Festival, the Sakip Sabanci Museum in Istanbul and the Icelandic National Concert and Conference Centre, Harpa. Parrott's work was instrumental in setting up a three-year Vienna Philharmonic Orchestra residency at the Artis-Naples visual and performing arts centre in Florida, commencing in March 2016.

Parrott is a former chairman and president of the British Association of Concert Agents (now the International Artist Managers' Association).

== Publications ==
Parrott's close working relationship with Vladimir Ashkenazy led to the co-authorship of the latter's life story, 'Beyond Frontiers' which has been translated into seven languages.

== Personal life ==
Jasper Parrott was educated at Tonbridge School in Kent and at Peterhouse, Cambridge, where he read history. He is the youngest son of Sir Cecil Parrott KCMG OBE (29 January 1909 - 23 June 1984), a leading British diplomat and later a professor at the University of Lancaster, with a passion for classical music.

Parrott married pianist Cristina Ortiz in 1974. They have two daughters.
