= William Cleland =

William Cleland may refer to:

- William Cleland (poet) (c. 1661–1689), Scottish poet and soldier
- William Cleland (surgeon) (1912–2005), Australian-born British cardiothoracic surgeon
- W. Wallace Cleland (1930–2013), American professor of biochemistry
- W. L. Cleland (William Lennox Cleland, 1847–1918), medical doctor in South Australia
