= Anders Grubb =

Swedish chemist, physician, and academic

- Born: 1944 (age 81–82)
- Occupations: Chemist, physician, and academic
- Awards: Poul Astrup´s Award for Distinguished Research in Clinical Chemistry; Eric K. Fernström's Award for Distinguished Biomedical Research; The Kone Award for Distinguished Research in Clinical Chemistry, British Association of Clinical Biochemistry; The jubilee-award for distinguished scientific work, Swedish Society of Medical Sciences; Lorentz Eldjarn´s award (2010, 2016)

Anders Grubb (born 1944) is a Swedish chemist, physician, and academic. He is currently a Senior Professor of Clinical Chemistry at Lund University.

== Education ==
Grubb earned his Ph.D. degree in Clinical Chemistry in 1974 and an M.D. in 1975. Following this, he attended The New York University Medical Center as a Postdoctoral fellow in 1975, and The University Hospital Ramon y Cajal in Madrid in 1980.

== Career ==
Grubb joined the medical faculty of Lund university in 1967. In 1989 he was appointed as Professor and Senior Physician in the Department of Clinical Chemistry and Pharmacology. Since 2011, he has been serving as Senior Professor at the Department of Clinical Chemistry and Pharmacology at Lund University.

== Research ==
Grubb has published over 350 articles, has been cited over 31,000 times with an h-index of 90, and has 10 patents awarded. His research spans the areas of protein chemistry, renal medicine and clinical chemistry.

=== Structure and Function of Cystatin C ===
Grubb and coworkers isolated a protein previously described to be present in urine and spinal fluid, but without known structure and function, called, among other things, ɣ-trace, and developed a method for measuring it in various body fluids. He also determined the amino acid sequence of the protein's single polypeptide chain and the secondary and 3D-structure of the protein as well as the nucleotide sequence of its mRNA and gene. Northern blot studies showed that cystatin C was produced by all nucleated human cells. The biological function of cystatin C was suggested to be inhibition of cysteine proteinases by Grubb and coworkers in 1984. The role of cystatin C, and peptidyl derivatives mimicking its inhibitory site, in inhibiting the replication of viruses and bacteria was thereafter described, as well as its role in the hereditary disorder Hereditary Cystatin C Amyloid Angiopathy (HCCAA).

=== Role of Cystatin C in Estimating Glomerular Filtration Rate (GFR) ===
Grubb and coworkers discovered in 1979 that cystatin C was a marker of GFR and could be used to estimate GFR. They have used cystatin C for estimation of GFR in the clinical routine since 1994. Grubb and coworkers have developed cystatin C-based GFR-estimating equations, which in several patient cohorts are superior in diagnostic efficiency to creatinine-based GFR-estimating equations, and, in contrast to creatinine-based GFR-estimating equations, do not require controversial coefficients for race or sex. Grubb was chairman of an IFCC working group for development of an international calibrator for cystatin C and such a calibrator, designated ERM-DA471/IFCC, was produced and described in 2010. In a proteomic study, Grubb and coworkers studied the plasma levels of 2893 proteins and found that cystatin C was the one with the highest correlation to measured GFR.

=== Cystatin C, Glomerular Filtration Quality and Shrunken Pore Syndrome ===
Grubb and coworkers have established that the most reliable way to estimate GFR is to use both a cystatin C-based and a creatinine-based GFR-estimating equation and compare the results of the two estimations. If they agree, the estimation has the same reliability as an invasive determination of GFR. This comparative procedure allowed the definition of a new type of kidney disorder characterized by a greater reduction of renal clearances of larger molecules (e.g. cystatin C, 13,343Da) than of smaller ones (e.g. creatinine, 113Da) and identified by a greater reduction of the cystatin C-based GFR-estimate (eGFR_{cystatin C}) than that based upon creatinine (eGFR_{creatinine}). This kidney disorder was called Shrunken Pore Syndrome to emphasize the greater reduction in renal clearance of molecules bigger than creatinine in this disorder. Dardashti, Grubb and coworkers demonstrated that Shrunken Pore Syndrome was associated with a marked increase in mortality and that the lower the eGFR_{cystatin C}/eGFR_{creatinine}-ratio, the higher the mortality. Grubb and coworkers have described that the pathophysiology of the syndrome might be connected to the altered proteome in the disorder with accumulation of inter alia atherosclerosis-promoting proteins. The syndrome has been described by Grubb and coworkers to be one of the most common kidney disorders.

== Awards and honors ==
- 1984 - Poul Astrup´s Award for Distinguished Research in Clinical Chemistry
- 1987 - Eric K. Fernström's Award for Distinguished Biomedical Research
- 1989 - The Kone Award for Distinguished Research in Clinical Chemistry, British Association of Clinical Biochemistry
- 1991 - The jubilee-award for distinguished scientific work, Swedish Society of Medical Sciences
- 2007 - The Falcon Order of Iceland for successful cooperation/education with/of Icelandic scientists
- 2010, 2016 - Lorentz Eldjarn´s award

== Bibliography ==
=== Books ===
- Cystatin C as a multifaceted biomarker in kidney disease and its role in defining "Shrunken Pore Syndrome". (2017) In Biomarkers of kidney disease ISBN 978-0-12-803014-1. Editor: C. L. Edelstein. Elsevier. pp. 225–240.
- Laurells Klinisk kemi i praktisk medicin (2018) ISBN 978-91-44-11974-8
