= William Cleland (surgeon) =

Australian surgeon in the United Kingdom

William Paton Cleland (30 May 1912 – 29 March 2005) was an Australian born British cardiothoracic surgeon and was one of the early pioneers of open-heart surgery.

== Career ==
Cleland was born in Sydney, Australia, the son of Professor Sir John Burton Cleland (1878–1971) and his wife, Dora Isabel Paton (1880–1955). Cleland studied medicine in Adelaide and graduated in 1934. He moved to the UK in 1938 with the intention of becoming a physician, but his experiences during the Second World War sparked an interest in surgery. He was further influenced by Tudor Edwards, Lord Russell Claude Brock and Sir Clement Price Thomas.

In 1948 he was appointed consultant thoracic surgeon at Royal Brompton Hospital and Kings College and the following year as a lecturer at Hammersmith Hospital, where Dennis Melrose was developing the heart-lung machine. In 1953 Cleland performed the first open-heart operation in the UK and in 1959 was the first surgeon to operate on the condition obstructive cardiomyopathy.

In 1959 the Hammersmith team, with Dennis Melrose's heart-lung machine, Cleland as the lead surgeon and Hugh Bentall as the assistant surgeon, were invited by Alexander Bakulev to the Institute of Cardiovascular Surgery in Moscow where, watched by over 200 surgeons from the Soviet Union, they carried out five open-heart operations leading to the introduction of open-heart surgery to Soviet Russia. Anastas Mikoyan, the First Deputy Premier of the Soviet Union at the time, congratulated the team saying "Doctors are clean, but politicians are dirty".

Cleland was civilian consultant to the Royal Navy, a post he held until his retirement in 1977. Cleland established heart surgery units in Egypt, Iraq and Syria and was awarded the Order of the Falcon and the Order of the Lion of Finland by the Icelandic and Finnish governments respectively.
