= Pálsdóttir =

Pálsdóttir is an Icelandic and Faroese patronymic meaning "daughter of Páll". It is not a family name. Notable people with the surname include:

- Andrea Mist Pálsdóttir (born 1998), Icelandic footballer
- Arna Sif Pálsdóttir (born 1988), Icelandic handball player
- Eivor Pálsdóttir (born 1983), Faroese singer-songwriter
- Elinborg Pálsdóttir (born 1996), Faroese singer-songwriter
- Ólöf Pálsdóttir (1920–2018), Icelandic sculptor
- Ólöf Helga Pálsdóttir (born 1985), Icelandic basketball player
- Sigrún Pálsdóttir (born 1967), Icelandic writer
- Þorbjörg Pálsdóttir (1919–2009), Icelandic sculptor
