= Hugh Bentall =

English surgeon

Hugh Bentall

Hugh Henry Bentall FRCS (28 April 1920 – 9 September 2012) was a British surgeon who pioneered open-heart surgery.

== Career ==
Bentall was educated at Seaford College and studied medicine at St Bartholomew's Hospital in London. After graduating he worked as general surgeon at the North Middlesex Hospital (where he assisted in Britain's first successful pulmonary embolectomy and in the first successful surgical correction of Oesophageal atresia) and at the London Chest Hospital where he specialised in thoracic surgery. He then joined the Royal Navy and served in Britain and on the hospital ship Empire Clyde in the Pacific Fleet, and later in Singapore treating liberated prisoners of war.

Bentall was Consultant Thoracic Surgeon at Hammersmith Hospital from 1955 to 1985. In 1959 he and his team, with Bill Cleland as the lead surgeon, were invited to visit the Institute of Cardiovascular Surgery in Moscow where they carried out five open-heart operations, watched by more than 200 of the Soviet Union's leading surgeons. In 1962 he performed an operation to repair a "hole in the heart" which was filmed for the BBC TV series Your Life in Their Hands. In 1966 he devised a procedure to treat a patient with Marfan syndrome, replacing the aortic valve and ascending aorta in a single operation. This is now known as the Bentall procedure and is widely used.

Bentall taught at the Royal Postgraduate Medical School from 1959 as lecturer, from 1962 as reader and from 1965 as Britain's first Professor of Cardiac Surgery. He retired in 1985.
