= Gabríel Ólafs =

Icelandic musician

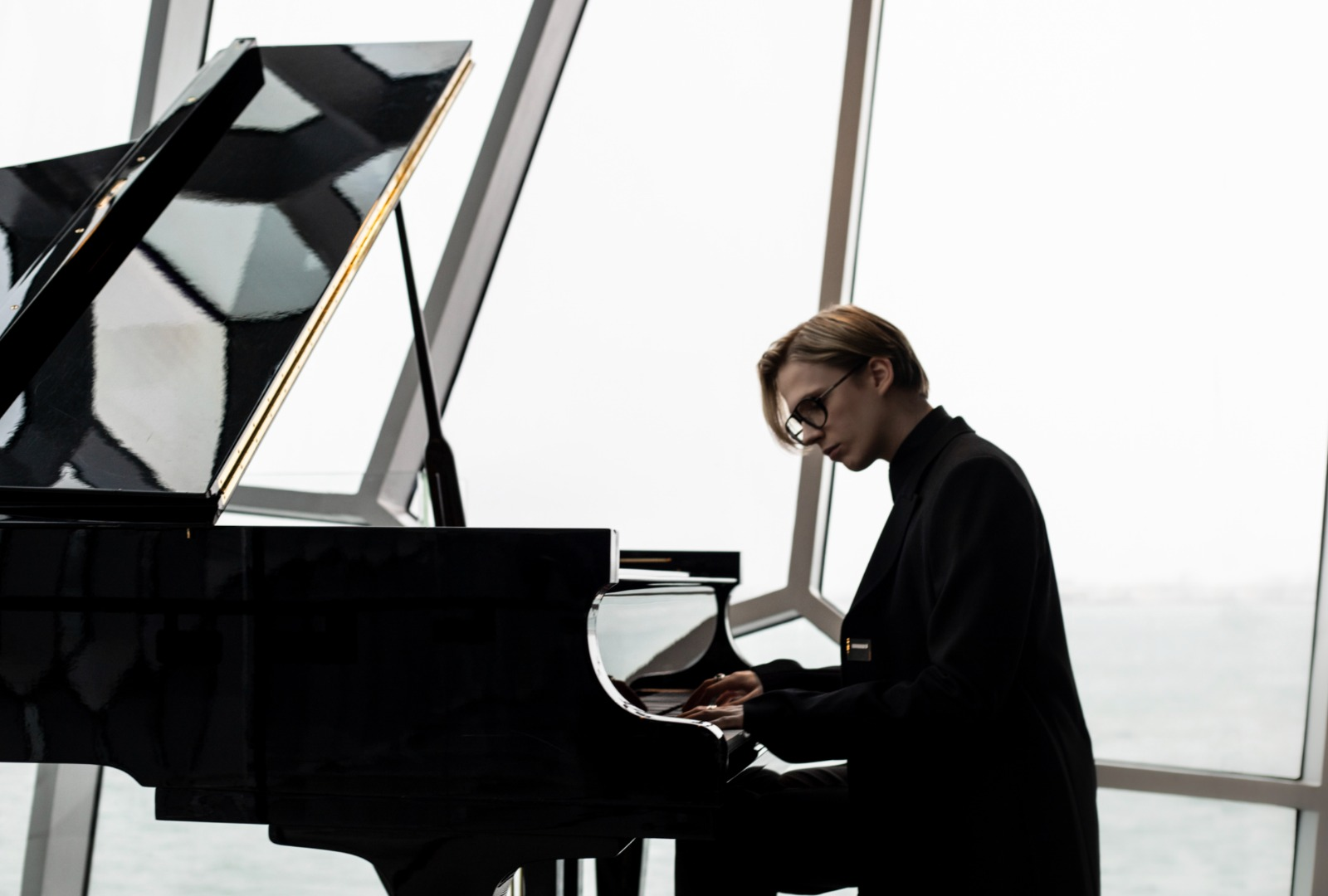
- Gabríel Ólafs at Harpa in 2022

Background information
- Born: Gabríel Örn Ólafsson; 3 December 1998 (age 27); Reykjavík, Iceland
- Occupations: Pianist; composer; producer
- Instrument: Piano
- Labels: Decca Records US; One Little Independent Records
- Website: www.gabrielolafs.com

Gabríel Ólafs (born Gabríel Örn Ólafsson, 3 December 1998) is an Icelandic pianist, composer, producer, Decca Records US recording artist, and cofounder of the Reykjavík Orkestra. He is known for instrumental music for piano, strings, choir, and electronics, influenced by classical music, Icelandic poetry, Norse tradition, film, fantasy, and the natural world.

== Early life and independent career ==
Ólafs was born and grew up in Reykjavík. He began playing piano at age five. He received both classical and jazz training, including studying jazz in his teens at the FÍH music school.

He was 14 when he wrote a piece called "Absent Minded." It ultimately led to his first record deal, after Derek Birkett, Björk’s manager, heard his first live performance on Icelandic TV, leading to his signing with Björk’s label, One Little Independent Records (then called One Little Indian Records). "Absent Minded" became the title track of his debut album Absent Minded, released on the label in 2019 when he was 19. The track "Staircase Sonata" was streamed more than 10 million times on Spotify.

On 26 June 2020 he released his second album, also on One Little Independent, called Piano Works. Pop Matters described the music as "eight rather stunning solo instrumental pieces...devoid of empty showmanship, technical posturing, or any shallow attempts to dazzle the listener. Instead, Ólafs focuses on mood and emotive gestures to develop pieces, both concise yet brimming with beauty." Paste Magazine included it in its Favorite Instrumental Albums of 2020, and the track "Filma Solo" was streamed more than 30 million times on Spotify.

On 13 November 2020, One Little Independent released a reworked version of Absent Minded titled Absent Minded Reworks. The reworked tracks featured contributions from Kelly Moran, Niklas Paschburg, Masayoshi Fujita, and Hugar.

== Decca Records US ==
The success of his early recordings brought him to the attention of Decca Records US, and in 2022 he signed with the label. That year Decca released his album Solon Islandus, with music inspired by the poetry of Davíð Stefánsson and instrumental expansion to include choir and orchestra.

On 9 June 2023 Decca released his album Lullabies for Piano and Cello, inspired by ancient Viking melodies he found in a Reykjavík antique bookshop, in an out-of-print book published over 100 years before. The album includes re-imaginings of tunes from the book as well as original lullabies. He and cellist Steiney Sigurðardóttir recorded the album in Reykjavik's Eldborg Concert Hall. The album made the Billboard Classical Albums chart for the week of June 24, 2023. NPR described the album as "transporting the listener to a soothing landscape".

As his music became popular in the classical crossover genre and on streaming playlists such as Spotify's Calming Classical, he became the first (and as of 2024 the only) Icelandic composer to have amassed over 100 million streams before turning 25.

Ólafs was selected as one of Classic FM's Rising Stars as a "young musician reshaping classical music".

In February 2025 Decca released Ólafs' Polar, an album described as "a work of speculative fiction in musical form." A narrated edition featured a spoken short story by Rebecca Roanhorse.

== Reykjavík Orkestra ==
In 2022, Ólafs founded the Reykjavík Orkestra (originally called Reykjavík Recording Orchestra) with audio engineer Bergur Þórisson. Based in the Harpa concert hall in Reykjavík, the company has produced works for the BBC, Netflix, Apple TV+, and composer Hans Zimmer. In 2024 Gabríel received the Nordic Music Biz award as an exceptional music professional under 30.

== Discography ==
- Absent Minded (2019)
- Piano Works (2020)
- Absent Minded Reworks (2020)
- Solon Islandus (2022)
- Lullabies for Piano and Cello (2023)
- Orchestral Works (2024)
- Polar (2025)
- Polar: Dusk (2025)
- Polar: Abyss (2026)
