= Icelandic National Opera =

Opera company in Reykjavík, Iceland

The Icelandic National Opera (Icelandic: Þjóðaróperan) is an arts institution based in Reykjavík, Iceland. It was founded by a law passed by the Icelandic Parliament in 2025, with operations expected to begin in 2026.

== History ==
The Icelandic Opera, the predecessor of the Icelandic National Opera, moved to Harpa Concert Hall in 2011. Several controversies were seen as undermining its operations, including a law suit filed by a leading soprano for breach of contract during rehearsals of The Marriage of Figaro. The singer, Þóra Einarsdóttir, won the case at the Icelandic Court of Appeal in 2022. The following year, then Minister of Culture Lilja Alfreðsdóttir announced that the Icelandic government would cease its financial support of the self-governing Icelandic Opera, which at the time amounted to ca. ISK 216 million [$1.64 million, €1.5 million]. Instead, a new, state-run company was announced on the model of the nation's other leading arts institutions, the National Theatre and Iceland Symphony Orchestra. After several delays, in part due to a snap election and forming of a new government in December 2024, a new "stage arts bill" (sviðslistalög) was passed in the Icelandic parliament in June 2025. According to the new law, the organization of the Opera is part of the National Theatre, with 12 full-time positions intended for solo singers and 16 part-time positions for choir members.

In September 2025, the position of Opera Director was advertised, with 11 people applying for the post. In November that year, it was announced that the appointment of a Director would be delayed because the Minister of Culture, Logi Einarsson, was disqualified from making the decision, since one of the applicants had been an employee of the Ministry in preparing the new law. In January 2026, it was announced that Finnur Bjarnason would be hired as Opera Director.

While initial plans were made for the first opera production of the National Opera in 2026, it was announced in February 2026 that the first full production would appear in March 2027, of Verdi's Falstaff with Ólafur Kjartan Sigurðarson in the leading role.
