= Pike Ward =

English fish merchant (1856–1937)

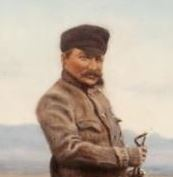
Pike Ward in 1901.

Pike Ward (1856-1937) was an English fish merchant who spent the majority of his career in Iceland, where he developed the Icelandic fishing industry. Ward was awarded the Grand Cross of the Icelandic Falcon by King Christian X of Denmark in 1936, in recognition of his contribution to the nation's fishing industry and economy.

== Life ==
Pike Ward was born into a family of ship brokers in Teignmouth in the South West of England. Ward worked in Iceland between 1891 and the outbreak of the First World War. He was the first person to pay Icelandic fishermen in cash rather than by barter and as such had a significant impact on the development of commercial fishing in Iceland. He was the first person to run a trawler from an Icelandic port - the Utopia at Hafnarfjörður, but the venture was not a success. His main business was in the buying of smáfiskur (small fish under 16 inches long) that no one else was buying. He taught Icelanders how to salt and soft dry fish for British markets, a product that became known universally in Iceland as Wardsfiskur.

The National Museum of Iceland holds a collection of around 400 objects collected by Pike Ward in Iceland.

== Exhibitions ==
An exhibition on Pike Ward was held in Teignmouth by Ambassador Thordur Aegir Óskarsson in 2017 to celebrate the life of Ward.

"Pike Ward's Iceland Photographs, objects and cuttings from the collection of an English fish merchant", an exhibition on Ward's time in Iceland opened in the National Museum of Iceland in the autumn of 2019 and was open till the beginning of 2020.
