= Garðar Thór Cortes =

Icelandic tenor

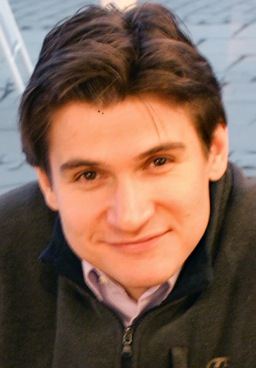
- Born: 2 May 1974 (age 52); Reykjavík, Iceland
- Occupation: Opera singer (tenor)
- Years active: 1999–present

Garðar Thór Cortes (pronounced Icelandic pronunciation: [ˈkarðar tʰouːr ˈkʰɔr̥tɛs], born 2 May 1974) is an Icelandic tenor of Icelandic and English parentage. A former child actor, Garðar subsequently trained as a singer in Vienna, Copenhagen and London. He has performed various leading tenor roles in operas, as well as a leading part in The Phantom of the Opera in London's West End. While insisting that he is first and foremost a classical opera singer, it was with his classical crossover album Cortes, released in Iceland in 2005, that Garðar came to prominence. His debut album in the UK, also titled Cortes, was released on 16 April 2007 and entered the UK Classical Charts at number 1.

== Family, early life and education ==
Garðar was born in Reykjavík, Iceland, into a musical family. His father, Garðar Cortes Snr., was a world-class tenor who founded the Icelandic Opera, the Reykjavík School of Singing and the Reykjavík Symphony Orchestra. According to Garðar, his father had the same stature as Pavarotti and Domingo, and once when he was ill while performing in Oslo, Domingo stepped in for him. "He sang the main spinto tenor roles, including Caravadossi [from Tosca], Otello, Alfredo [La traviata] and Canio [Pagliacci]. He'd go away to sing Otello in Helsinki and he'd be there for several weeks, and he became so homesick he couldn't do it, so he didn't go as far as he should have and stopped." His English mother, Krystyna, was a concert pianist who studied at the Royal Academy of Music in London. His sister Nanna Maria is an operatic soprano, while his younger brother Aron Axel is studying to become a baritone. When commitments permitted, the Cortes children performed in the chorus when their father was conducting an opera.

Garðar spent six months at a Hertfordshire private school in England when he was aged 9 and 11. At 13, he won the lead role of Nonni in Nonni and Manni (1988–1989), an Icelandic TV series about two children living with their mother and grandmother in the late 1850s, which was filmed in Iceland, Norway and England and highly successful in Europe. Actor Einar Örn Einarsson, who played Manni, remains Garðar's best friend.

Soon after he turned 18, Garðar decided he wanted to be a singer. He spent four years at his father's school in Reykjavík and then won a scholarship to the Hochschule, or University of Music and Performing Arts, Vienna, but left after six months to study privately with Professor Andrei Orlowitz in Copenhagen. For the next five years, he spent two weeks in Denmark, then flew home to earn enough to pay the tuition and the airfares. He sang at funerals and weddings, appeared as Tony in West Side Story at the National Theatre in Reykjavík in 1995, and for five summers worked with disabled people. At the opera, he was the toilet cleaner, the usher and the doorman. Recalling his father's advice about the hardships of a musical career, Garðar has commented: "Even though he told me it was difficult, I still wanted to pursue this road. But looking back, you realise he was right, it is bloody difficult! Excuse the language."

Other teachers that he had the opportunity to work with included David Maxwell Anderson, Stuart Burrows, Paul Farrington, Paul Wynne Griffiths, David Jones, Kiri Te Kanawa and Robin Stapleton.

== Professional singing career ==
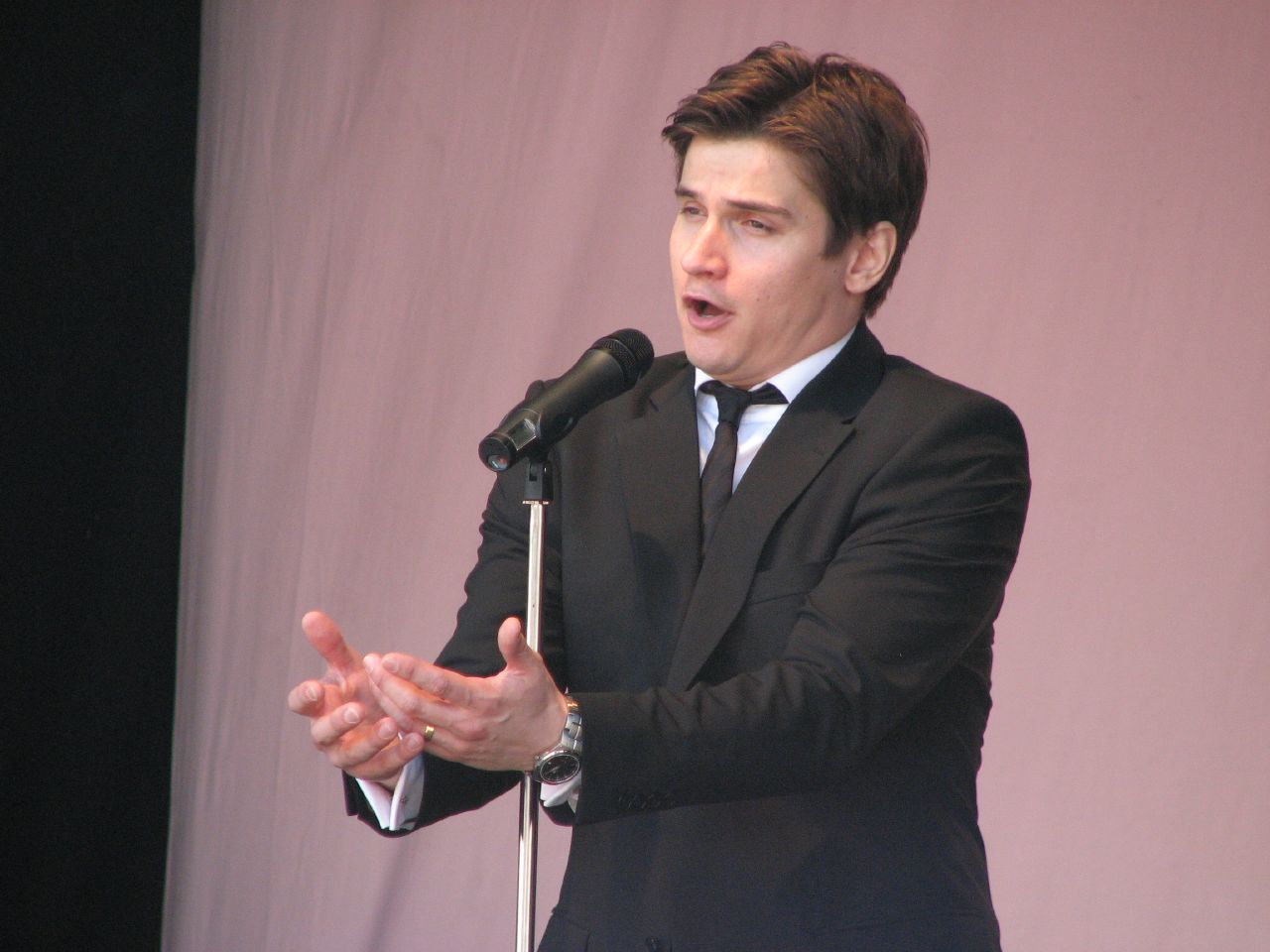
Cortes performing at Covent Garden in London in June 2007

In 1999, Garðar won the principal role of Raoul, Vicomte de Chagny, in The Phantom of the Opera at Her Majesty's Theatre in London's West End.

However, when invited to extend his contract, Garðar declined. He won a scholarship to the opera course at the Royal Academy of Music, where both his sister Nanna and mezzo-soprano Katherine Jenkins were at the time. At the Academy, roles he sang included Florville in Il signor Bruschino and Fenton in Verdi's Falstaff.

After leaving the Academy, Garðar worked across Europe, playing lead tenor roles in operas by Verdi, Rossini and Donizetti in opera houses in Germany and Scandinavia. He sang Mendelssohn's quartets from Elijah with his sister at Carnegie Hall, New York City. Other engagements included José in Carmen Negra, Curly in Rodgers and Hammerstein's Oklahoma!, The Young Man in Dokaðu við, the Italian Tenor in Strauss's Der Rosenkavalier for the Icelandic Opera, Ferrando in Mozart's Così fan tutte for Co–Opera Ireland, Rinuccio in Puccini's Gianni Schicchi for Nordurop Opera, and a Verdi Gala at The Anvil in Basingstoke, England. His concert repertoire includes Bach's Mass in B Minor, Britten's St. Nicolas, Dvořák's Requiem, Verdi's Requiem, Handel's Messiah, Elijah, Puccini's Messa di Gloria, Rossini's Petite messe solennelle and Stabat Mater, and Saint-Saëns' Christmas Oratorio.

His debut concert in Reykjavík in 2002, where he was joined by Katherine Jenkins, was a triumph. Garðar returned the favour as a guest performer during Jenkins' autumn tour in 2006. He was hailed for his commanding performances of Puccini's aria "Nessun dorma" and widely admired for his brooding good looks. Highlights of his career in 2004 and 2005 included his first appearances with English Touring Opera singing Ferrando in Così fan tutte, and at the Rossini in Wildbad Festival singing Conte Alberto in L'occasione fa il ladro. He recently performed the role of The Duke of Mantua in Verdi's Rigoletto for Opera Nordfjord.

Garðar was approached by Einar Bárðarson, manager of Icelandic girl band Nylon, who suggested that he make a record like Andrea Bocelli or Josh Groban. The songs, including Lucio Dalla's "Caruso" and Ennio Morricone's "Nella Fantasia", Malavasi's "Romanza", David Foster and Carole Bayer Sager's "The Prayer" and some Icelandic numbers, were chosen by Garðar, Einar and Björgvin Halldórsson – the "Frank Sinatra of Iceland" – to best show off his voice. The record, eponymously titled Cortes, was released in Iceland in 2005 and turned out to be the fastest-selling ever in that country, achieving double platinum status in three months. He was also voted the sexiest man in Iceland twice in one year in separate polls.

His single "Luna" (2007), featuring English soul singer Heather Small, reached number two on the Icelandic online music charts. His first album in the UK, Cortes, which was released on 16 April 2007, entered the UK Classical Charts at number 1 and the UK albums chart at number 27, a first for an Icelandic artist. It remained at number 1 for two weeks – the weeks ending 28 April and 5 May 2007 – on the official ClassicFM chart. It has since gone double platinum.

Despite his classical crossover success, Garðar has said, "I don't want to go too far down the pop side because then I think I would lose credibility in the classical world. If the album [Cortes] does well, hopefully I could use that to my advantage, but I'm a classical opera singer – that's what I do, that's what I am." His ambition is to sing Otello at the Royal Opera House in Covent Garden, London.

In 2011, he appeared in The Phantom of the Opera at the Royal Albert Hall, as Passarino. He also released an album of Icelandic songs in collaboration with his father, Gardar Thor Cortes Sr., called Ísland. In 2012, an opera CD was released, named Rossini: L'Occasione Fa Il Ladro, which had Cortes as one of the casting tenors.

Garðar performed as Alfredo in La traviata at Harpa concert hall in Reykjavik on 6 and 7 September 2014.

From 2015-2016, Garðar played the leading role of The Phantom in the German premiere of Love Never Dies in Hamburg. He left that production early to star as the Phantom in the original The Phantom of Opera musical in its French premiere in Paris. The production was postponed due to a fire at the Theatre Mogador, and it is unknown when or if it will happen, and if Garðar will star then. Garðar also reprised his starring role as the Phantom in the 1st North American tour of Love Never Dies for the 2017/2018 season.

In November 2021, Garðar would have once again reprised his role as The Phantom in a Finnish concert production of Love Never Dies were it not for unforeseen changes, by which he was replaced by Swedish actor John Martin Bengtsson.

== Discography ==
=== Albums ===
Solo albums

- 2005: Cortes [Iceland release]
- 2007: Cortes [International release]
- 2008: When You Say You Love Me

Albums with other artists

- 1998: Carmen Negra (Icelandic Opera)
- 2001: Elía (Iceland Symphony Orchestra)
- 2003: Dokaðu við
- 2003: Passía
- 2010: Frostrósir – Hátíðin heilsar
- 2011: Ísland [Under the name Cortes Feðgar, with his father]
- 2011: The Phantom of the Opera at Royal Albert Hall [Soundtrack]
- 2012: L'occasione fa il ladro
- 2014: Á hátíðlegum nótum

== Personal life ==
The Cortes family is one of the less than 5% of Icelanders who have a surname. Although Garðar's maternal grandfather was Polish and the family is a mix of Danish, English, Icelandic, Italian, Spanish and Swedish people, they do not know how and where the family name "Cortes" comes from. Garðar speaks fluent English, and at home, members of his family converse in a mixture of Icelandic and English – often in the same sentence.

Garðar loves to watch movies – "everything from slushy romantic comedies to shoot 'em up cop thrillers."

In 2007, Garðar married Tinna Lind Gunnarsdóttir. They had been together since 2000 but then divorced in 2014.

On 14 February 2020, Garðar married Elva Dögg Melsteð.

== Sources ==
- Official website of Garðar Thór Cortes
- Sweeting, Adam (17 March 2007). "Iceland's Hottest Geezer : The World is Warming to Icelandic Tenor Gardar Thór Cortes". The Daily Telegraph (Review). Archived from the original on 28 March 2007.
