= Cristina Ortiz =

Brazilian pianist (born 1950)

Ortiz in 1969

Cristina Ortiz (born April 17, 1950, in Bahia) is a Brazilian pianist.

== Biography ==
Born in Bahia, Brazil, Cristina Ortiz began her studies in her home country before moving to France with Magda Tagliaferro. Soon after finishing her studies in Paris, she won the first prize of the third edition of the Van Cliburn International Piano Competition. She continued her study with Rudolf Serkin in Philadelphia at the Curtis Institute of Music and later moved to London, where she currently lives.

Ortiz has performed in most of the major concert halls around the world, and has been invited to be a soloist by the Berlin Philharmonic, Vienna Philharmonic Orchestra, Philharmonia, Chicago Symphony Orchestra, Sydney Symphony Orchestra, Philadelphia Orchestra, Royal Concertgebouw Orchestra, Cleveland Orchestra, WDR Symphony Orchestra Cologne, Deutsches Symphonie-Orchester Berlin, Valencia Orchestra, Iceland Symphony Orchestra and the NHK Symphony Orchestra. She has performed with conductors including Vladimir Ashkenazy, Neeme Järvi, Mariss Jansons and David Zinman.

Ortiz has recorded for EMI, Decca, BIS, Collins Classics, and Intrada. She has given master classes at the Royal Academy of Music in London and the Juilliard School in New York.

She married Jasper Parrott in 1974. They have two daughters.
