= Volcano Express =

Volcano attraction in Iceland

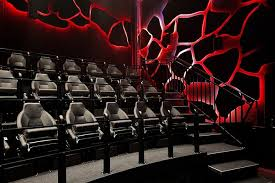
Volcano Express interior

Volcano Express is an immersive exhibition and cinematic attraction located in Harpa Concert Hall in Reykjavík, Iceland on the building's K2 level. Opening in March 2025, it presents Icelandic volcanic activity through a combination of pre-show exhibition space and short-format motion simulator experience. The attraction combines real eruption footage, dynamic seating, subsonic audio, and environmental effects to depict the geological processes associated with Iceland's active volcanism.

== Overview ==
Volcano Express is part of Iceland's geotourism sector, which has increased rapidly since the 2010 eruption of Eyjafjallajökull and the renewed eruptive activity on the Reykjanes Peninsula beginning in 2021. It is designer for general audiences, including families, and is centrally located within Harpa Concert Hall at Austurbakki 2, 101 Reykjavik. Shows run continuously throughout the day at 15-minute intervals.

== Pre-show area ==
Visitors arrive early to explore a dedicated pre-show space comprising five elements:

- "Volcanic Window" - a continuous display providing real-time footage of the Reykjanes Peninsula, located approximately 29 kilometers from Harpa. During active eruptions, the screen switches to a live feed of ongoing lava flow.
- "Four Short Films" - four screens each present a short film exploring aspects of Iceland's volcanic forces, including plate tectonics, types of volcanic eruptions, and the landscapes ongoing transformation.
- "Story Map" - an interactive map illuminating Iceland's fissure system and the locations of all 247 recorded eruptions since the country's settlement.
- "Quake Monitor" - a real-time seismicity display showing Iceland's earthquake activity over the preceding 48 hours, along with elapsed time since the most recent eruption.
- "Instacrater" - a reflective video sculpture incorporating volcanic imagery, designed as a photographic installation.

== Main content ==
The main show runs approximately nine minutes. The narrative begins with an aerial view of Reykjavík, including the city's harbor and its geothermal origins - referencing the Old Norse meaning of Reykjavík (smoky bay) and the role of geothermal steam in attracting Iceland's first settlers. The experience then transitions underground, guiding viewers through lava tunnels and above active eruption sites on the Reykjanes Peninsula.

The presentation uses wrap-around high-resolution video on a curved screen, combined with motion simulator seating that reacts to on-screen content. Environmental effects include simulated heat, vibration, and wind. Audio includes infrasound designed to be felt as well as heard. The attraction does not use computer-generated imagery for its primary volcanic sequences; footage is sourced from drone, satellites and ground-based cameras documenting actual eruptions.

== Development ==
The concept originated in 2019 and entered active development in 2020-2021, coinciding with the onset of renewed volcanic activity on the Reykjanes Peninsula. Creator Kristján Ra. Kristjánsson has stated that the installation in Harpa Concert Hall involved total expenditures exceeding 500 million Icelandic króna, attributed to technical and design requirements.

== Reception ==
Volcano Express has been noted as an indoor activity in Reykjavik, particularly during periods of inclement weather. It has been compared to FlyOver Iceland and Lava Show as part of a cluster of immersive experiential attractions in the capital. Travel coverage has positioned it as a starting point for tourists intending to explore Iceland's volcanic landscapes

== See also ==
- Geology of Iceland
- Volcanism of Iceland
- Mid-Atlantic Ridge
- Icelandic Meteorological Office
- Geotourism
- Harpa Concert Hall
