= The Icelandic Opera =

Former Icelandic opera company in Reykjavík

The Icelandic Opera (Íslenska óperan) was an opera company based in Reykjavík that produced operas and concerts. Its productions emphasized Icelandic artists, but regularly involved foreign artists as well. The company performed between October and May every year at the Harpa concert hall until 2024, their home venue since the hall's opening in 2011.

As of October 2017, the company had produced 85 operas.

== History ==
=== Founding and operations (1979–2023) ===
The company was founded in the late 1970s by opera tenor Garðar Cortes, father of tenor Garðar Thór Cortes. He remained artistic director until Ólöf Kolbrún Harðardóttir, also an opera singer, took over in 1992. Steinunn Birna Ragnarsdóttir was appointed the new director of the company in April 2015.

The company's first performance was Leoncavallo's Pagliacci in March1979. Since then, the company had performed classics by Mozart, Rossini, Bizet, Verdi, Puccini and others. For the first 30 years of its existence, the organization performed in the cinema Gamla Bíó on Ingólfsstræti in downtown Reykjavík.

=== Loss of funding and closure (2023–2024) ===
In 2023, the Icelandic government announced it would cease funding the Icelandic Opera after 2024 in order to establish a new national opera company, with plans to start operating in 2025. The new organization, Icelandic National Opera, is currently set to launch at the Harpa concert hall in 2026 as a division of the National Theatre of Iceland.
