= Erling Blöndal Bengtsson =

Danish cellist (1932–2013)

Erling Blöndal Bengtsson (8 March 1932 – 6 June 2013) was a Danish cellist.

Born in Copenhagen, Bengtsson gave his first public performance there in 1936, when he was four years old. He was admitted at the age of sixteen to the Curtis Institute of Music in Philadelphia where he studied with Gregor Piatigorsky, who engaged him as a teaching assistant in 1949. From 1950 to 1953, Bengtsson taught his own cello class at the institute, before being appointed to the Royal Danish Academy of Music in Copenhagen. In 1980, he became a professor at the Hochschule für Musik Köln. He returned to America in 1990 and taught at the University of Michigan School of Music until his retirement from academia in 2006.

Bengtsson was a member of the Royal Swedish Academy of Music and was conferred the title Chevalier du Violoncelle by Indiana University in 1993. Bengtsson made most of his phonograph and CD recordings with the Danish label Danacord. In November 2006, Danacord released the DVD The Cello and I, which presented a comprehensive portrait of Bengtsson's career on the seventieth anniversary of his debut. He died in Ann Arbor, Michigan, aged 81.

Bengtsson was the subject of a sculpture (The Musician) in 1970 by the Icelandic sculptor Ólöf Pálsdóttir, of him playing the cello. In 2014 this was moved to a location in the water, next to the Iceland Symphony Orchestra's new home of the Harpa in Reykjavík.
