= Poul Bjørndahl Astrup =

Danish clinical chemist

Poul Bjørndahl Astrup (4 August 1915 – 30 November 2000) was a Danish clinical chemist famous for inventing a CO_{2} electrode and co-inventing the concept of base excess.
