= Rósa Áslaug Valdimarsdóttir =

Icelandic football player

Personal information
- Date of birth: 6 March 1959 (age 67)
- Place of birth: Reykjavík, Iceland
- Position: Midfielder

Senior career*
Years	Team	Apps	(Gls)
1972–1983	Breiðablik		
1984	ÍBÍ		
19??-1996	Sindri		

International career
1981–1983	Iceland	5	(1)

Managerial career
- 1984: ÍBÍ
- Sindri
- * Club domestic league appearances and goals

Rósa Áslaug Valdimarsdóttir (born 6 March 1959) is an Icelandic former footballer who was the captain of Iceland's inaugural women's national football team in 1981.

Rósa played for Breiðablik from 1972 to 1983. In 1973, she led all players in the Icelandic championship with 10 goals, including 6 goals in one game. In 1981, she won the ignaural Icelandic Football Cup, scoring 2 goals in Breiðablik's 4-0 win against Valur in the Cup final. She later played for Íþróttabandalag Ísafjarðar and Sindri Höfn which she also coached for several years.
