= Order of the Falcon =

Icelandic order of chivalry

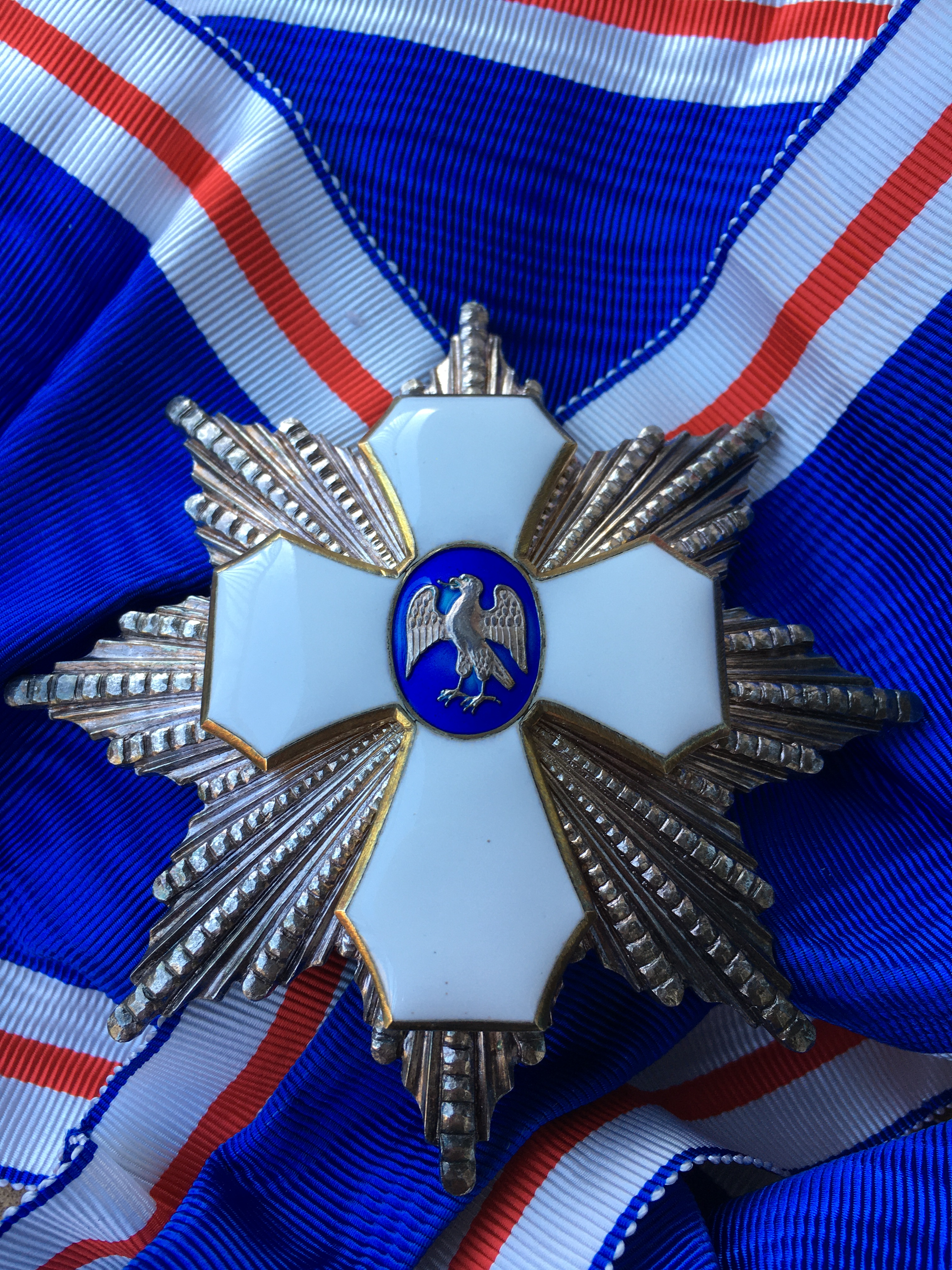
- Grand Cross star

Awarded by the President of Iceland
- Type: State order
- Established: 3 July 1921
- Country: Iceland
- Status: Currently constituted
- Grand Master: President of Iceland
- Classes: Grand Cross with Collar; Grand Cross; Grand Officer; Grand Knight's Cross; Knight's Cross
- Ribbon of the Order of the Falcon

The Order of the Falcon (Icelandic: Hin íslenska fálkaorða) is the only order of chivalry in Iceland, founded by King Christian X of Denmark and Iceland on 3 July 1921. The award is awarded for merit for Iceland and humanity and has five degrees. Nowadays, appointments are made on the nomination of the President of Iceland and that of a "five-member council".

== History and appointments ==
Christian X, the King of Denmark, ruled Iceland until 17 June 1944. During his royal visit to Iceland in 1921, King Christian X issued the royal decree founding the Icelandic Order of the Falcon. When Iceland became a republic, new statutes were incorporated for the Order on 11 July 1944. The Republic of Iceland replaced the King by an elected President of Iceland who is the designated Grand Master of this Order. It may be awarded to both Icelanders and citizens of other countries for achievements in Iceland or internationally. A five-member council makes recommendations on awards to the Grand Master, who then grants the award. However, the Grand Master may award the Order without recommendations from the Order Council. The Grand Master and the Chairman of the Order Council then sign the Letters Patent, which are presented to the awards's recipients.

== Classes ==
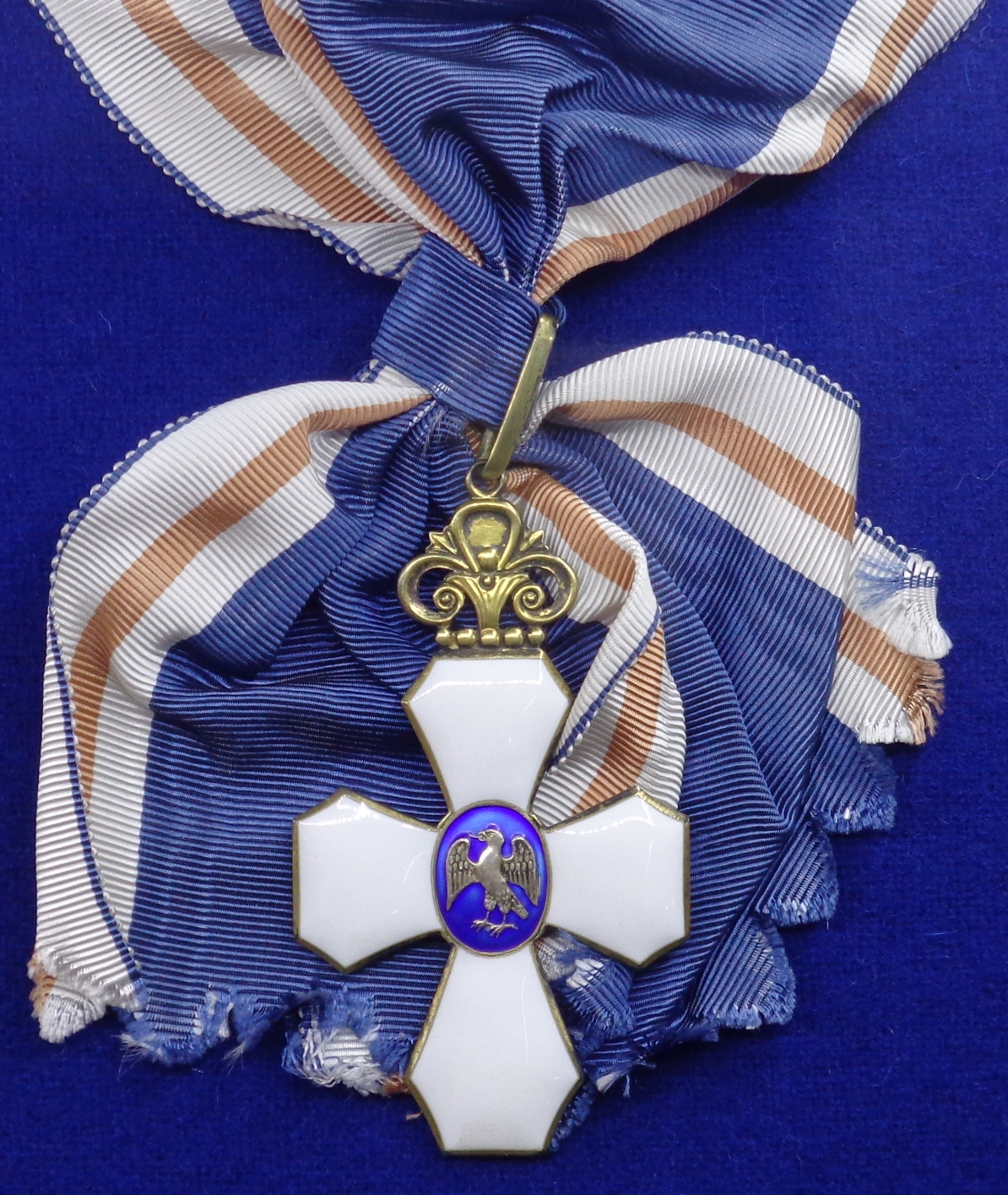
Grand Cross sash and sash badge

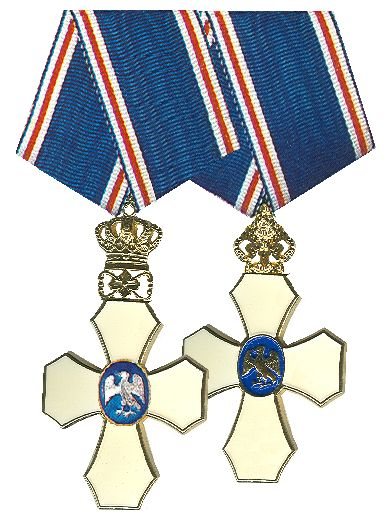
Knight's Crosses on current suspension and older crown suspension

The Order has five classes:

1. Collar with Grand Cross Breast Star (Keðja ásamt stórkrossstjörnu), only for heads of state
2. Grand Cross (Stórkross)
3. Grand Knight's Cross with Star (Stórriddarakross með stjörnu)
4. Grand Knight's Cross (Stórriddarakross)
5. Knight's Cross (Riddarakross)

== Insignia ==
The collar is gilded metal; it consists of links bearing the Icelandic coat-of-arms and blue-enamelled discs bearing the white falcon.

The badge consists of a gilt cross, enamelled in white, with a blue-enamelled central disc bearing the white falcon.

The star is a silver, eight-pointed star. For the Grand Cross class it has the badge of the Order superimposed upon it. For the Grand Knight with Star class it has a blue-enamelled central disc bearing the white falcon.

The ribbon is blue with white-red-white border stripes. It is worn on the left shoulder.

- Collar with Grand Cross Breast Star; wears the badge on a collar plus a star on the left chest;
- Grand Cross; wears the badge on a sash on the left shoulder, plus a star on the left chest;
- Grand Knight's Cross with Star; wears the badge on a necklet, plus a star on the left chest;
- Grand Knight's Cross; wears the badge on a necklet;
- Knight's Cross; wears the badge on a chest ribbon.

If a holder is promoted to a higher rank, the lower rank's insignia must be returned. The insignia are retained during the recipient's lifetime, but they must be returned to the Icelandic Government upon the recipient's death.

Ribbon bars
| Collar with Grand Cross | Grand Cross | Grand Knight's Cross with Star | Grand Knight's Cross | Knight's Cross |

== Notable recipients ==
=== Politicians and heads of state ===
- Albert II, former King of Belgium
- (Canada) Janis Johnson, Canadian Senator, Manitoba
- Margrethe II, former Queen of Denmark
- Frederik X, King of Denmark
- Mary, Queen of Denmark
- Prince Joachim of Denmark
- Princess Marie of Denmark
- Princess Benedikte of Denmark
- Lennart Meri, former President of Estonia
- Alexander Stubb, President of Finland
- Sauli Niinistö, former President of Finland
- Tarja Halonen, former President of Finland
- Martti Ahtisaari, former President of Finland
- Mauno Koivisto, former President of Finland
- Urho Kekkonen, former President of Finland
- Juho Kusti Paasikivi, former President of Finland
- Kyösti Kallio, former President of Finland
- Frank-Walter Steinmeier, current President of Germany
- Halla Tómasdóttir, current President of Iceland
- Guðni Th. Jóhannesson, former President of Iceland
- (Iceland) Guðni Ágústsson, former Minister of Agriculture
- (Iceland) Jóhannes Jóhannesson, first Chairman of the Order of the Falcon Committee
- Ólafur Ragnar Grímsson, former President of Iceland
- Vigdís Finnbogadóttir, former president of Iceland and first popularly elected female president in the world
- Dalia Grybauskaitė, former President of Lithuania
- Princess Beatrix of the Netherlands
- Harald V, King of Norway
- Sonja, Queen of Norway
- Haakon, Crown Prince of Norway
- Mette-Marit, Crown Princess of Norway
- Princess Ingrid Alexandra of Norway
- Princess Märtha Louise of Norway
- (Norway) Princess Astrid, Mrs. Ferner
- Juan Carlos I of Spain, former King of Spain
- Sofía, former Queen of Spain
- (Spain) Infanta Elena, Duchess of Lugo
- Infanta Cristina of Spain
- Carl XVI Gustav, King of Sweden
- Silvia, Queen of Sweden
- Victoria, Crown Princess of Sweden
- (Sweden) Prince Daniel, Duke of Västergötland
- (Sweden) Prince Carl Philip, Duke of Värmland
- (Sweden) Princess Sofia, Duchess of Värmland
- (Sweden) Princess Madeleine, Duchess of Hälsingland and Gästrikland
- (Sweden) Christopher O'Neill
- (Sweden) Princess Christina, Mrs. Magnuson
- (United Kingdom) Prince Philip, Duke of Edinburgh, consort of Elizabeth II
- Elizabeth II, former Queen of the United Kingdom and the other Commonwealth realms
- Lisa Murkowski, United States Senator, Alaska

=== Artists and entertainers ===
- (Iceland) Björk Guðmundsdóttir, singer/songwriter
- (United States) Brad Leithauser, writer, poet, and scholar
- (Iceland) Edda Björgvinsdóttir, actress
- (Denmark) Erling Bløndal Bengtsson, cellist
- (Iceland) Helga Bachmann, actress
- (Iceland) Jónas Jónasson, composer and radio host
- (Iceland) Laufey Lín Bing Jónsdóttir, singer/songwriter
- (Iceland) Nína Dögg Filippusdóttir, actress
- (Iceland) Ólöf Pálsdóttir, sculptor
- (Iceland) Páll Ísólfsson, organist, composer, and radio host
- (Iceland) Ragga Gísla, singer, composer, and actor
- (Iceland) Stefán Karl Stefánsson, actor and singer
- (Iceland) Steinunn Thorarinsdottir, sculptor
- (Iceland) Þorkell Sigurbjörnsson, composer
- (Iceland) Vladimir Ashkenazy, pianist and conductor
- (Denmark) Victor Borge, concert pianist and entertainer

=== Scholars ===
- (United Kingdom) A. R. Taylor, Professor of Medieval English, Old Norse and Modern Icelandic Studies at the University of Leeds
- (Sweden) Anders Grubb, Professor of Clinical Chemistry at the University of Lund, for research on Icelandic hereditary diseases
- (United Kingdom) Andrew Wawn, philologist
- (United States) Carol J. Clover, Professor of Medieval Studies (Early Northern Europe) and American Film at the University of California, Berkeley.
- (United Kingdom) George P. L. Walker, volcanologist
- John T. Casteen III, educator, for his contribution to cultural exchange and support for students in Iceland and the United States
- (United States) John Lindow, Professor Emeritus of Old Norse and Folklore at the University of California, Berkeley, for scholarly contributions in the area of Icelandic medieval literature
- (United States) Lee M. Hollander, academic and translator of Kierkegaard
- (Iceland) Margrét Bjarnadóttir, for her research and "transformative approach to pay equity"
- (United Kingdom) Mark Watson, archaeologist, dog breeder and benefactor
- (United Kingdom) Rory McTurk, Professor of Icelandic Studies at the University of Leeds
- (Iceland) Sigrún Árnadóttir, for the translation of several books to Icelandic including Alfie Atkins, and for her contributions to Icelandic children's culture
- (Iceland) Thorbergur Thorvaldson, cement chemist
- Unnur Anna Valdimarsdóttir, Professor of Epidemiology at the University of Iceland
- (Australia) William Paton Cleland, surgeon

=== Other ===
- (United States) Anna Kisselgoff, reporter, for coverage of Icelandic ballet
- (Finland) Antti Tuuri, writer, translated Icelandic sagas
- (United Kingdom) Arthur Young, police officer
- (Canada) Beverly Arason-Gaudet, President of the Icelandic National League of North America
- (United States) David Architzel, Vice Admiral of the US Navy
- (Iceland) Friðrik Skúlason, computer scientist)
- (Iceland) Guðmundur Kjærnested, Commander of the Icelandic Coast Guard
- (Iceland) Hilmar Örn Hilmarsson, chief goði of the Ásatrúarfélagið
- Iceland men's national handball team, silver medalists in handball at the 2008 Summer Olympics)
- (United States) James L. Kauffman, Vice Admiral of the US Navy during World War II
- (United States) John W. White USAF General, Commander of the Iceland Defense Force
- (Socialist Federal Republic of Yugoslavia) Koča Popović, Colonel General of the YPA)
- (Portugal) Leonor Beleza, lawyer, former Minister of Health and 1st President of the Champalimaud Foundation
- (Iceland) Monika Helgadóttir, farmer
- (Iceland) Orri Vigfússon, Chairman of the North Atlantic Salmon Fund
- (United Kingdom) Pike Ward, fisherman who started and developed the Icelandic fishing industry
- (Canada) Signy Stefansson Eaton, socialite and philanthropist of Icelandic descent
- (Iceland) Sunna Olafson Furstenau, Founder/President of Icelandic Roots, Þjóðræknisfélag Ísland
- (United States) William S. Key, Major General during World War II
