= Ólöf Pálsdóttir =

Icelandic sculptor (1920–2018)

Ólöf Pálsdóttir (14 April 1920 – 21 February 2018) was an Icelandic sculptor, and was responsible for one of the most-prominently located statues in Reykjavík, that of a cellist in the water next to the new concert hall.

== Early life ==
Ólöf Pálsdóttir was born in 1920 to Páll Ólafsson and Hildur Stefánsdóttir. She attended Verzlunarskóli Íslands in Reykjavík, the oldest private school in Iceland. Completing school coincided with the start of WWII. She then spent the War in the Faroe Islands. After the War, she studied sculpture under Ingeborg Bachman in Denmark, under Einar Utzon-Frank at the Frederiksberg Technical School in Copenhagen, under Ramses Wissa Wassef in Egypt, and in Rome.

== Career ==
Her works include:

- Son (1920), on the east bank of the Tjörnin in Reykjavík, which portrays a young man, his arms thrown wide open to greet life and all its opportunities. Olof once said that the sculpture symbolises the youth of Iceland.
- Girl (1950), in the Hallargardur (Palace Garden) in Reykjavík, which portrays a young girl, of an indeterminate age, kneeling.
- The Musician (1970), in the water next to the Harpa in Reykjavík, the home of the Iceland Symphony Orchestra, and modelled on the Danish cellist Erling Blöndal Bengtsson, who played constantly for Ólöf as he sat for her. When the Orchestra was based at the Háskólabíó, the statue was located on Hagatorg, but it followed the Orchestra to its new home in 2014.

She is one of five female sculptors whose work is featured in the Women's Sculpture Park in Hljómskálagarður Park.

She was awarded the Knight's Class of the Order of the Falcon in 1970.

== Personal life ==
She married Sigurður Bjarnason, a newspaper editor, politician and diplomat, (18 December 1915 – 5 January 2012) on 5 February 1956; they had two children, Hildur Helga and Ólafur Páll.

She died in 2018, aged 97.
