= Maximus Musicus =

Icelandic children's musical franchise

The cover of the second Maximus Musicus book, in the original Icelandic.

Maximus Musicus is an Icelandic children's franchise, including books, CDs, DVDs and family concert programs, aimed at introducing symphonic music to children. The story and part of the music was written by Hallfríður Ólafsdóttir, principal flautist of the Iceland Symphony Orchestra. The books are illustrated by Þórarinn Már Baldursson, a violist in the ISO. Conductor and pianist Vladimir Ashkenazy is the program's patron.

== Books ==
The first book introduces Maximus, a mouse that finds his way into a concert hall, and enjoys many adventures as he explores the world of the symphonic orchestra rehearsing there. It was first published in Iceland in 2008 along with an audio CD. The second book of the series tells of Maximus exploring a school of music. It was published in 2010 along with an audio CD.

== Concerts ==
Each story of Maximus is designed to be performed by a full symphonic orchestra, a narrator and silent actor playing the part of Maximus. Accompanying the performance are illustrations from the books, projected to an onstage screen. The story is told to an abridged Boléro, the first movement of Beethoven’s Fifth and Copland’s Fanfare for the Common Man as well as Maxi’s Song, composed by author Hallfríður, and the Icelandic all-time favourite “Á Sprengisandi” by Sigvaldi Kaldalóns.

== Reception ==
Maximus Musicus became very popular upon introduction in Iceland in 2008 and was both financially and critically successful for both authors and the ISO, as the family-concerts were uniformly sold out. The second installment became no less of a success on its release in 2010. Maximus Musicus has gained international attention as the program has been translated from the Icelandic into English, German, Dutch, Portuguese (Brasil) and Korean. The series is published domestically by Forlagið and internationally by Schott. The concert program has been performed live in Iceland, the Netherlands, Germany, the US and Australia.
