= Aleksandr Bakulev =

Soviet surgeon (1890–1967)

- Александр Бакулев
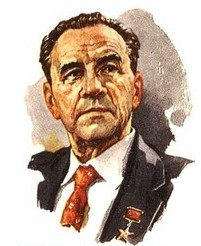
- Born: 7 December [O.S. 25 November] 1890; Nevenikovskaya, Vyatka Governorate, Russian Empire
- Died: March 31, 1967 (aged 76); Moscow, Soviet Union
- Education: Saratov University
- Known for: First usage of radio opaque substances in kidney surgery during transplantation of the ureters, first successful lung ablation with open ductus arteriosus (1948), treatment of brain abscesses using repeated punctures with infill of cavities with air
- Awards: Stalin Prize (1949)^{1}; Lenin Prize (1957)^{2}; Gold Scalpel (1965)
- Scientific career
- Fields: Thoracic surgery
- Workplaces: Saratov University, 2nd Moscow Institute of Medicine

Notes
- ^{1}For lung surgery operations^{2}For treatment of heart diseases and arterial vessels

Aleksandr Nikolayevich Bakulev (Russian: Алекса́ндр Никола́евич Ба́кулев; 7 December [O.S. 25 November] 1890 - 31 March, 1967) was a Soviet surgeon, one of the founders of cardiovascular surgery in the USSR.

Born in Nevenikovskaya (now in the Kirov oblast) into a peasant family which belonged to the old Vyatka clan of Bakulevs, Bakulev attended the medical faculty of Saratov University after graduating from high school. During the First World War he served as a regimental medical officer on the Western Front. In 1938 Bakulev conducted a successful lobectomy in a case of chronic lung abscess. In 1939 he earned the academic degree of Professor and the same year conducted a successful lobectomy in a case of pulmonary actinomycosis. In 1943 Bakulev became head of the surgery department of the 2nd Pirogov Moscow Institute of Medicine. On the Eastern Front of World War II, Bakulev was the chief surgeon of Moscow evacuation hospitals. In 1948 he pioneered the surgical treatment of congenital heart disorders in the Soviet Union. He was the President of the USSR Academy of Sciences from 1953 to 1960.

In 1955 he suggested the foundation of the Thoracic Surgery Institute (now the Bakulev Scientific Center of Cardiovascular Surgery) and then became its first head. In 1958 Bakulev was elected as a member of the Soviet Academy of Sciences.

Bakulev died in Moscow in 1967. A medical prize was named after him. In 1999 an asteroid was named in his honour.

== Honours and awards ==
- Hero of Socialist Labour (Decree of the Presidium of the Supreme Soviet on 8 December 1960)
- Lenin Prize (1957)
- Stalin Prize, 2nd class (1949)
- Three Orders of Lenin (1945, 1953, 1960)
- Order of the Red Banner of Labour (1951)
- Order of the Red Star (1942)
- Order of Merit to the Nation (Yugoslavia)
- Order of Civil Merit (Bulgaria)
- Honoured Scientist of RSFSR (1946)
- Doctor honoris causa of the University of Turin
- The Golden Scalpel International Award (1965)
