= Necrovation =

- Also known as: Das Über Evils
- Origin: Everöd, Sweden
- Genres: Death metal
- Years active: 2002–present
- Labels: Blood Harvest, Agonia
- Website: necrovation.com

Necrovation is a Swedish death metal band from Everöd. The band was formed in 2002 originally with the name Das Über Evils. When the band changed its name to Necrovation, they adopted a more serious sound and got into pure old school death metal (OSDM). Necrovation is considered as "one of the major bands of the Swedish OSDM revival".

== Discography ==
Das Über Evils

- Bratwurst Terror (demo, 2002)

Necrovation

- Ovations to Putrefaction (demo, 2004)
- Chants of Grim Death (EP, 2004)
- Necrovation / Corrupt: Curse of the Subconscious (split, 2005)
- Breed Deadness Blood (2008)
- Gloria mortus (EP, 2010)
- Necrovation (2012)
- Storm the void (2023)

== See also ==
- Kaamos
- Repugnant
- Tribulation
