= Concha Hidalgo =

Spanish actress (1923–2019)

María Concepción Hidalgo (13 December 1923 – 30 November 2019), was a Spanish actress, better known in TV series like Aída, La que se avecina, El internado, Hospital Central, Águila Roja and the awarded films Goya's Ghosts, Matador, Voyage to Nowhere.
