= Unnur Anna Valdimarsdóttir =

Icelandic academic

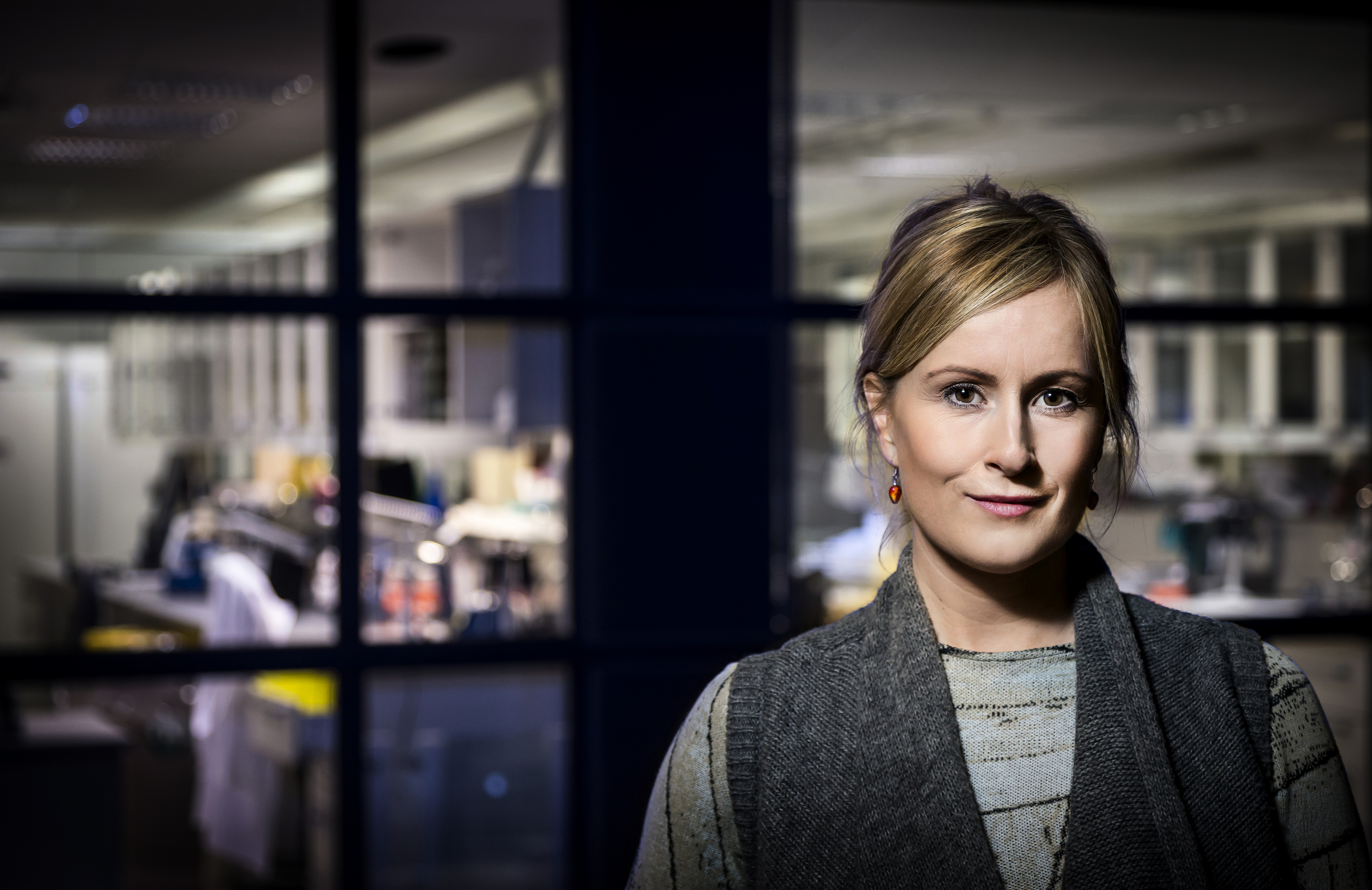
- Born: 1972 (age 53–54)
- Occupation: professor in epidemiology at the Faculty of Medicine of the University of Iceland

Unnur Anna Valdimarsdóttir (born 1972) is a professor in epidemiology at the Faculty of Medicine of the University of Iceland. Her research focuses on the role of trauma and other life adversities in health and disease development.

== Professional experience ==
Unnur completed her matriculation examination from the natural sciences track of Akureyri Junior College in 1992 and a BA in psychology from the University of Iceland in 1996. She started a doctoral programme at Karolinska Institutet in Stockholm in 1999 and completed her doctorate in clinical epidemiology in 2003. Her doctoral dissertation, "The loss of a husband to cancer: additional and avoidable psychological traumata", focused on widows' health and adjustment after their husbands'' sickness and death due to cancer. From 2003 to 2006, Unnur continued working as a post doctoral fellow at Karolinska Institutet. There she laid the foundation for her research plan to the present.

In 2007 Unnur was hired as an associate professor in epidemiology at the Faculty of Medicine at the University of Iceland and was promoted to professor in 2012. She served as Deputy Dean of the Faculty of Medicine from 2013 to 2017. Unnur became the first head of a newly founded cross-disciplinary master's and doctoral programme in Public Health in 2007 and served in that capacity until 2017. She has taught courses for medical students and graduate students in epidemiology and other public health-related subjects and has also supervised many master's and PhD students. Unnur has been an adjunct professor at the Department of Epidemiology at Harvard TH Chan School of Public Health in Boston since 2013, and a guest professor at the Department of Medical Epidemiology and Biostatistics at Karolinska Institutet since 2015. She has also been active in advising students and research collaboration with scholars of those institutions.

== Research ==
The overarching aim of Unnur's research team is to advance knowledge on, on the role of trauma and other life adversities such as loss of a loved one, diagnosis of cancer, natural catastrophes, and violence, in the development of various diseases. She has published her findings in approximately 150 scientific articles. Several of these articles have been published in some of the world's leading scientific medical journals, e.g., The New England Journal of Medicine, JAMA, Lancet Psychiatry, and BMJ. Unnur has also presented her findings in invited lectures at institutions of foreign universities and at international conferences.

== Acknowledgements and grants ==
Unnur has received many acknowledgements for her work, including: Science and Technology Incentive Award (2010), award from the Award Fund of Þórður Harðarson and Árni Kristinsson in medicine and related fields (2017) for outstanding research achievements. In 2017, she was the first woman to be named Female Academic of the Year. Unnur has received many research grants, including a recent Grant of Excellence from The Icelandic Centre for Research, and a Consolidator Grant from the European Research Council for research on the genetics of varying health trajectories following trauma.

== Personal life ==
Unnur's parents are Guðrún Jónsdóttir (b. 1939), hairdresser, and Valdimar Ágúst Steingrímsson (b. 1939), patrolman. Her siblings are Pétur Valdimarsson (b. 1966), graduate in business administration, and Jóna Ellen Valdimarsdóttir (b. 1977), registered nurse. Unnur's husband is Pétur Hafliði Marteinsson (b. 1973), entrepreneur, and they have one daughter.

In 2023, she was awarded the Order of the Falcon for her contributions to research.

== Main written works ==
- Valdimarsdóttir, Unnur A; Lu, Donghao; Lund, Sigrún H; Fall, Katja; Fang, Fang; Kristjánsson, Þórður; Guðbjartsson, Daníel; Helgason, Agnar; Stefánsson, Kári (12 November 2019). "The mother's risk of premature death after child loss across two centuries". eLife. 8 e43476. doi:10.7554/eLife.43476. PMC 6850766. PMID 31711568.
- Song, Huan; Fang, Fang; Arnberg, Filip K.; Mataix-Cols, David; Cruz, Lorena Fernández de la; Almqvist, Catarina; Fall, Katja; Lichtenstein, Paul; Thorgeirsson, Gudmundur; Valdimarsdóttir, Unnur A. (10 April 2019). "Stress related disorders and risk of cardiovascular disease: population based, sibling controlled cohort study". BMJ. 365 l1255. doi:10.1136/bmj.l1255. PMC 6457109. PMID 30971390.
- Song, Huan; Fang, Fang; Tomasson, Gunnar; Arnberg, Filip K.; Mataix-Cols, David; Cruz, Lorena Fernández de la; Almqvist, Catarina; Fall, Katja; Valdimarsdóttir, Unnur A. (19 June 2018). "Association of Stress-Related Disorders With Subsequent Autoimmune Disease". JAMA. 319 (23): 2388–2400. doi:10.1001/jama.2018.7028. PMC 6583688. PMID 29922828.
- Zhu, J.; Fang, F.; Sjölander, A.; Fall, K.; Adami, H.O.; Valdimarsdóttir, U. (August 2017). "First-onset mental disorders after cancer diagnosis and cancer-specific mortality: a nationwide cohort study". Annals of Oncology. 28 (8): 1964–1969. doi:10.1093/annonc/mdx265. PMID 28525559.
- Fang, Fang; Fall, Katja; Mittleman, Murray A.; Sparén, Pär; Ye, Weimin; Adami, Hans-Olov; Valdimarsdóttir, Unnur (5 April 2012). "Suicide and Cardiovascular Death after a Cancer Diagnosis". New England Journal of Medicine. 366 (14): 1310–1318. doi:10.1056/NEJMoa1110307. PMID 22475594.
