= Harpa (concert hall) =

Concert hall and conference center in Reykjavík, Iceland

Harpa Concert Hall and Conference Centre
- Harpa, tónlistar- og ráðstefnuhús
- Harpa
- Interactive map of the Harpa Concert Hall and Conference Centre area

General information
- Type: Concert hall & conference centre
- Location: Reykjavík, Iceland, Austurbakki 2, Reykjavík, Iceland
- Coordinates: 64°9′1″N 21°55′57″W
- Current tenants: Iceland Symphony Orchestra; Icelandic National Opera; The Reykjavík Big Band; Maximus Musicus
- Construction started: 12 January 2007
- Completed: 2011
- Opened: 13 May 2011
- Cost: €164 million
- Owner: City of Reykjavík; Government of Iceland

Height
- Height: 43 metres (141 ft)

Technical details
- Floor area: 28,000 square metres (300,000 sq ft)

Design and construction
- Architecture firm: Henning Larsen Architects; Batteríið
- Other designers: Olafur Eliasson, façade design Artec Consultants, acoustics design
- Main contractor: Íslenskir aðalverktakar (ÍAV)

Other information
- Seating capacity: 1,600–1,800 (Eldborg, main hall); 450 (Norðurljós); 750 (Silfurberg); 195 (Kaldalón)

Website
- Venue website

Harpa (Icelandic pronunciation: [ˈhar̥pa], English: Harp) is a concert hall and conference centre in Reykjavík, Iceland. The opening concert was held on 4 May 2011. The building features a distinctive colored glass façade inspired by the basalt landscape of Iceland.

== History ==
Harpa was designed by the Danish firm Henning Larsen Architects in co-operation with Danish-Icelandic artist Olafur Eliasson. The structure consists of a steel framework clad with geometric shaped glass panels of different colours. The building was part of a redevelopment of the Austurhöfn area dubbed World Trade Center Reykjavík, which was temporarily abandoned during the 2008–2011 Icelandic financial crisis. The development included a 400-room hotel, luxury apartments, retail units, restaurants, a car park and the new headquarters of Icelandic bank Landsbanki.

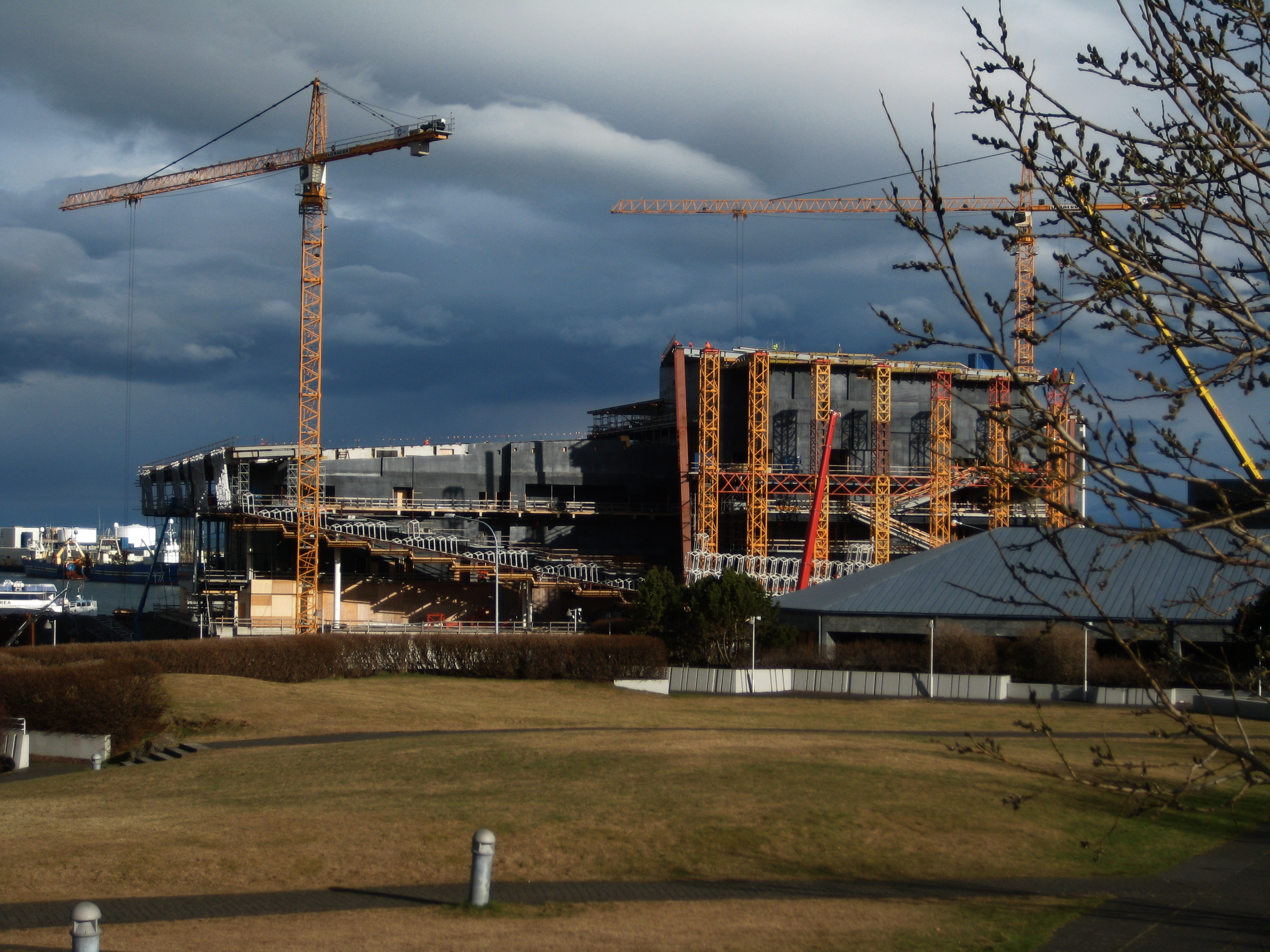
Harpa during its construction

Construction started in 2007 but was halted due to the 2008–2011 Icelandic financial crisis. The completion of the structure was uncertain until the government decided in 2008 to fully fund the rest of the construction costs for the half-built concert hall. For several years it was the only construction project in existence in Iceland. The building was given its name on the Day of Icelandic Music on 11 December 2009, prior to which it was called Reykjavík Concert Hall and Conference Centre (Icelandic: Tónlistar- og ráðstefnuhúsið í Reykjavík).

In the opening concert on 4 May 2011, Iceland Symphony Orchestra performed under the baton of Vladimir Ashkenazy with the Icelandic pianist Víkingur Ólafsson as soloist. The concert was broadcast live on RÚV, the Icelandic National Broadcasting Service.

The related hotel, retail and office developments were delayed, but resumed construction by 2018 and by 2023, the development was complete. The Reykjavik Edition Hotel, managed by Marriott International opened in 2021 along with retail and restaurant units; Landsbankinn moved into their new headquarter building in early 2023.

== Architecture and use ==
The building is the first purpose-built concert hall in Reykjavík and it was developed in consultation with artistic advisor Vladimir Ashkenazy and international consultant Jasper Parrott of HarrisonParrott. It houses the Iceland Symphony Orchestra and will house the Icelandic National Opera starting in 2026, succeeding the Icelandic Opera.

In the water next to Harpa is located the sculpture The Musician (1970) by the Icelandic sculptor Ólöf Pálsdóttir. The statue is of a cellist playing, and is modelled on the Danish cellist Erling Blöndal Bengtsson, who played constantly for Ólöf as he sat for her. When the Orchestra was based at its previous home at the Háskólabíó, the statue was located on Hagatorg, but it followed the Orchestra in 2014.

The Icelandic Opera performed at the concert hall even though the venue is primarily designed for concerts, lacking a curtain, proscenium, and any of the traditional stage machinery. The first director of Harpa was Halldór Guðmundsson. The current director of Harpa is Svanhildur Konráðsdótir. Harpa is operated by Portus, a company owned by the Icelandic government and the City of Reykjavík.

In 2013, the building won the European Union's Mies van der Rohe award for contemporary architecture. In 2017, the venue held the annual World Yo-Yo Contest, where over a thousand contestants from over 30 countries competed for the six champion titles. It was only the second time ever the contest was held in Europe.

Volcano Express is an immersive cinematic attraction which opened in March 2025 and is located on the lower level of the concert hall. The experience uses visual and sensory technology to take visitors above Iceland’s volcanic landscapes and deep into the Earth, combining real eruption footage with effects that simulate heat, wind, and seismic activity.

The glass façade of the building consists of 714 LED lights, 486 in the eastern part of the building and 228 in the western part. These lights display a video work designed by Olafur Eliasson. In 2021 for the building's 10 year anniversary, Eliasson made 12 new light works to exhibit on the glass, one to be exhibited for each month of the year. In 2014 Eliasson first granted other artists access to the building's advanced lighting system, when artists Atli Bollason and Owen Hindley exhibited the interactive art piece PONG, based on the classic arcade game Pong, for the city's Culture Night (Menningarnótt). This was the first time the façade was set to other uses than playing videos, and PONG was shown again the following year as a part of the Sónar Reykjavík festival. This marked the beginning of wider use of the light façade, as Harpa, Studio Ólafur Elíasson and the City of Reykjavík started having open applications for artistic proposals to utilize the façade the following year, and the winners got help with implementation from digital artist Owen Hindley.

== Notable events ==
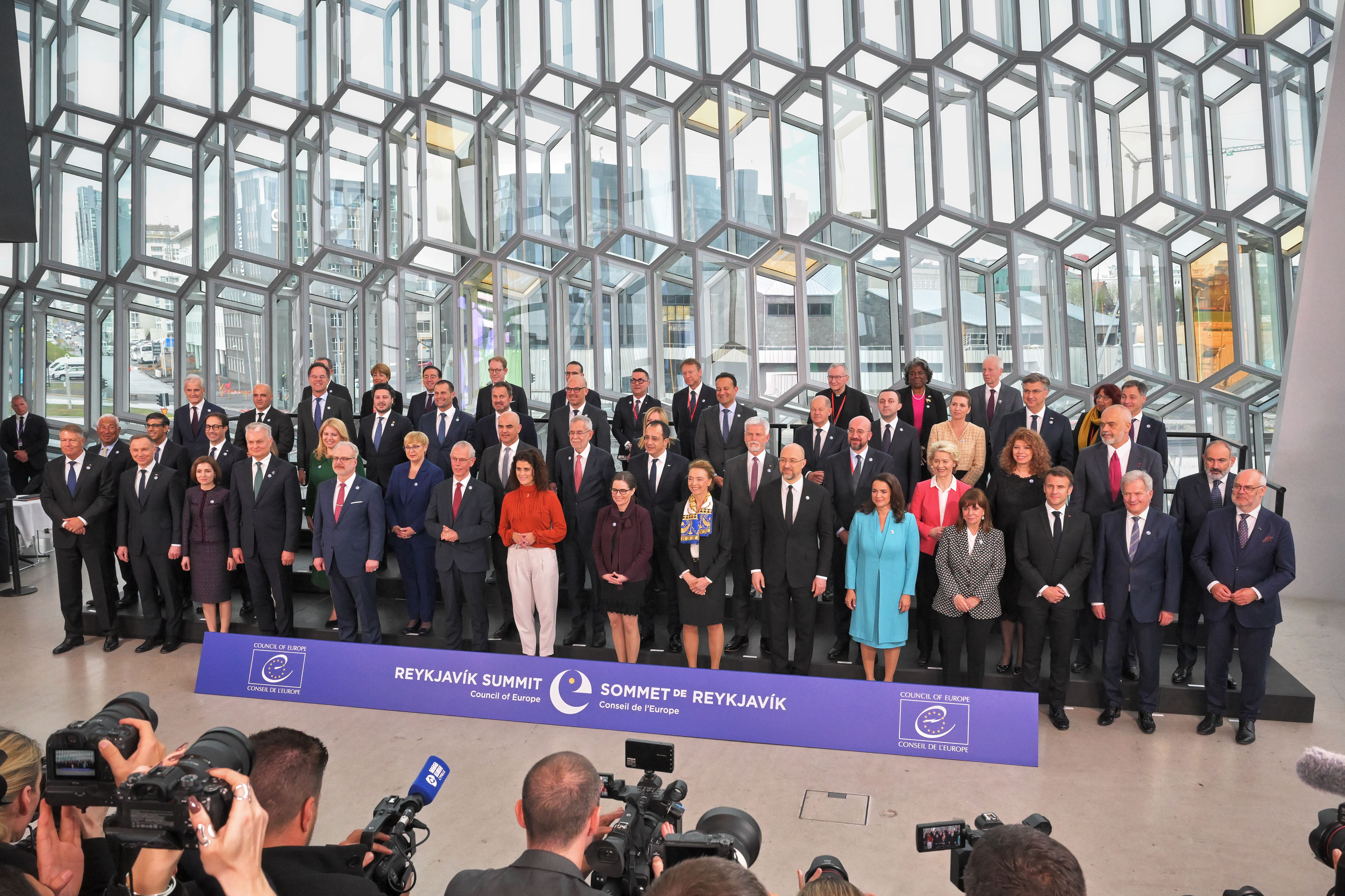
Fourth Council of Europe summit, held in 2023 in Harpa

In addition to hosting the Iceland Symphony Orchestra, Harpa is a popular conference centre and performing venue, and has hosted many other events and summits since its opening.

The fourth Council of Europe summit was held at Harpa in May 2023, with many European leaders in attendance. The Arctic Circle organisation holds its annual summit at Harpa.

The European Film awards, Iceland Airwaves, Reykjavik Arts Festival and EVE fanfest have been hosted at Harpa.

== Appearances in popular culture ==
View from inside Harpa building

In its unfinished state, Harpa (under the earlier name Tónlistarhús) appears in the 2009 novel Gæska: Skáldsaga by Eiríkur Örn Norðdahl, where it is temporarily turned into a mosque in Reykjavík with the addition of a minaret.

It was the setting of an episode of the Netflix series Sense8.

It appeared in the Netflix series Black Mirror on the episode "Crocodile".

It is the site of the "rose ceremony from hell" in season 26 of The Bachelor from 2022.

Harpa is featured in the film Heart of Stone from 2023.

== See also ==
- List of tallest buildings in Iceland
