= HarrisonParrott =

- Founded: 1969
- Headquarters: Somerset House, London, England, United Kingdom
- Number of employees: 75+
- Website: www.harrisonparrott.com

HarrisonParrott is an international artist and project management agency working in the field of classical music and the arts, with offices in London, Munich and Paris. It was founded in 1969 by Jasper Parrott and Terry Harrison.

== Company history ==
Harrison and Parrott entered the artist management business in the 1960s as employees of London-based Ibbs and Tillett Ltd. Deciding that the Ibbs and Tillett style of operation did not allow them to '...forge relationships with individual artists, engaging with them and their ideas and ambitions', they set up HarrisonParrott Ltd, working initially from a domestic residence. Theirs was very much a pro-active approach to developing musical careers.

In 1985 the company was one of the European artist management concerns which founded the European Artists Direct consortium, having the aim of negotiating contracts directly with concert promoters in North America.

Terry Harrison left HarrisonParrott in 1988 to set up Terry Harrison Artist Management, representing such names as Sir András Schiff and Mayumi Fujikawa. The company ceased trading in 2015 (then known as Harrison Turner Artist Management). Terry Harrison died early in 2017 at the age of 79.

Integrated within the HarrisonParrott group is Polyarts – a company created by Jasper Parrott’s daughter Moema Parrott in 2015.

Reflecting the global nature of its business, the company has become increasingly multilingual. According to a 2012 report in Classical Music magazine, Finnish, Greek, Italian, Mandarin, Portuguese, Spanish, Turkish, French, German, Hungarian, Japanese, Polish, Russian and Swedish were all spoken at HarrisonParrott's west London offices.

On 21 February 2018 the company moved its London office to The Ark, an office building in Hammersmith. It had previously been based at Albion Court, also in Hammersmith. It has since moved to new offices on nearby Hammersmith Grove.

As of 2024 the company is located at Somerset House in Central London.

The HarrisonParrott 50th anniversary was scheduled to be marked by three concerts in one day at London's Southbank Centre on 6 October 2019, featuring twenty of the company's artists. Also in 2019 former IT Director, Christopher Hoare, was convicted of stealing more than £360,000 from the company.

== International Piano Series ==
HarrisonParrott has collaborated with other artist management companies in piano and orchestral series at London's Southbank Centre. One example is the International Piano Series (in partnership with Southbank Centre) which for more than 30 years has presented established names and also provides a London platform for young talent. Pianists appearing have included Mitsuko Uchida, Khatia Buniatishvili, Alice Sara Ott, Víkingur Ólafsson, Benjamin Grosvenor and Bertrand Chamayou, while Southbank Centre schedules for the 2019–20 IPS season feature Pierre-Laurent Aimard, Maurizio Pollini, Ingrid Filter, Stephen Hough and Daniil Trifonov.

== Touring and international festivals ==
In 1995, HarrisonParrott arranged the Pierre Boulez Festival in Tokyo in collaboration with the Kajimoto management company. Previously, in 1991, the company had been one of the managing agents for the month-long Japan Festival in the UK.

Among the company's varied orchestral touring activities has been the Vienna Philharmonic's first-ever visit to Colombia (March 2016) and the first concert by the Royal Concertgebouw Orchestra in Yerevan, Armenia, conducted by Lorin Maazel in 2012. HarrisonParrott was active in the Minnesota Orchestra's visit to Cuba in 2015 – the first visit by a US orchestra since President Barack Obama took steps to normalise relations between the two countries in December 2014.

HarrisonParrott arranged performances of Akram Khan's production of Giselle with the English National Ballet in 2016, including in Hong Kong in 2018.

== Creative partnerships ==
HarrisonParrott also acts as a creative partner – including artistic planning, project management, marketing and sponsorship – for cultural institutions. These have included the London Chamber Orchestra, Shakespeare Birthplace Trust, Tiroler Festspiele Erl, Marvão International Music Festival, Estonian Festival Orchestra, Gothenburg Symphony and Le Balcon. Previous partnerships also include Harpa Hall (Reykjavik), Soundforms, Britten in Japan and Polska! Year. HarrisonParrott's relationship with Turkey goes back to the 1990s: in 2004, the company co-presented Şimdi Now – a festival of Turkish culture in Berlin, and in 2010 was consultant to La Saison de la Turquie, celebrating Turkish culture across France.

== HarrisonParrott Foundation ==
To mark HarrisonParrott's 50th anniversary, the company created the HarrisonParrott Foundation in April 2019. The Foundation's aim was to support and champion diversity and inclusivity within the arts and ’challenge the idea that ethnicity, gender, disability and social background are impediments'.
