= Bakulev Scientific Center of Cardiovascular Surgery =

Hospital in Russia

Coordinates: 55°45′42″N 37°22′36″E

Bakulev Scientific Center for Cardiovascular Surgery (Russian: Научный центр сердечно-сосудистой хирургии им. А.Н. Бакулева) is attached to the Russian Academy of Medical Sciences and is one of the leading cardiovascular surgery-related facilities of the Russian Federation. The center consists of Burakovskiy Institute of Cardiac Surgery and the Institute of Coronary and Vascular Surgery, both located in Moscow, as wells as it has a filial branch in Perm - Perm Heart Institute. In 2005 the Center started the first phase of research into the transplant of marrow cells in patients with acute myocardial infarction.

== History ==
The center was founded in 1956 by Soviet surgeon Aleksandr Bakulev, being officially named the Thoracal Surgery Institute of the Academy of Medical Sciences of the USSR (Институт грудной хирургии Академии медицинских наук СССР) at the time. In 1961 the facility was renamed to the Institute of Cardiovascular Surgery and in 1967, following Bakulev's death, gained his name.

=== Heads of Center ===
Term	Name
1956-1958	Aleksandr Bakulev
1958-1959	Aleksey Busalov
1959-1966	Sergey Kolesnikov
1966-1994	Vladimir Burakovskiy
1994–present	Leo Bokeriya

== Degree mill ==
The network community Dissernet has pointed out that the center has repeatedly (>45 cases) awarded the Ph.D. level degrees based on heavily plagiarised and sometimes falsified theses.
