= List of islands of Iceland =

This is a list of islands of Iceland. It includes all islands larger than 1 km^{2}, as well as a number of smaller islands that are considered significant either because they are or used to be inhabited, or for specific historical, geographical or geological reasons. Thousands of other small islands and skerries are found along the coast, especially in Breiðafjörður.

The areas of some of these islands may vary comparatively rapidly due to volcanic activity and subsequent action by the sea. In the case of the groups of islands in Breiðafjörður, no area is listed. This is because measurement of the smaller islands is made difficult by a large tidal range of up to six metres.

== List ==
Island	Area (km^{2})	Population	Municipality
Akurey	0.07	0	Reykjavíkurborg
Álsey	0.25	0	Vestmannaeyjabær
Bjarnarey	0.4	0	Vestmannaeyjabær
Borgarey	0.5	0	Súðavíkurhreppur
Brandur	0.1	0	Vestmannaeyjabær
Brimilsnes, in Álftafjörður in the Eastfjords	0.6	0	Múlaþing
Brokey, the largest of many islands in Breiðafjörður (West), located a short distance from land; Iceland's sixth largest island by area	3.7	0	Dalabyggð
Drangey	0.2	0	Skagafjörður
Eldey	0.02	0	Reykjanesbær
Eldeyjarboði	<0.01	0	Reykjanesbær
Elliðaey	0.45	0	Vestmannaeyjabær
Engey	0.4	0	Reykjavíkurborg
Flatey “in Breiðafjörður” (West)	0.5	<10 (2018)	Reykhólahreppur
Flatey “in Skjálfandi” (North)	2.8	0	Þingeyjarsveit
Geirfuglasker (a skerry off Reykjanes with the same name disappeared in the 18th century)	0.02	0	Vestmannaeyjabær
Geldungur	0.02	0	Vestmannaeyjabær
Grímsey, situated on the Arctic Circle, off the north coast of Iceland	5.3	57 (2021)	Akureyri
Grimsey, in Húnaflói	0.43	0	Kaldrananeshreppur
Heimaey, Iceland's second largest island by area, the largest after the main island; main island of the Westman Islands	13.4	4,347 (2021)	Vestmannaeyjabær
Hellisey	0.1	0	Vestmannaeyjabær
Hergilsey	0.2	0	Reykhólahreppur
Hjörsey, Iceland's fourth largest island by area, located in Faxaflói bay (West)	5.5	0	Borgarbyggð
Hrappsey	1.7	0	Dalabyggð
Hrísey, Iceland's third largest island by area, located in Eyjafjörður fjord (North)	8.0	162 (2021)	Akureyri
Húsey, the largest of a group of about 20 islands and skerries referred to as “Hvalseyjar”, located in Faxaflói bay (West)	0.06	0	Borgarbyggð
Hvalbakur, Iceland's easternmost point	0.01	0	Múlaþing
Iceland, the nation's largest island by both area and population	103,125	362,000	numerous
Jólnir, created in an eruption in 1966, now eroded	0.0	0	Vestmannaeyjabær
Kolbeinsey, former island, Iceland's northernmost point; mostly eroded but still visible (2020) at low tide as two separate skerries	>0.00	0	Akureyri
Langey, “Long Island”, one of several islands with this name in Breiðafjörður (West)	1.1	0	Reykhólahreppur
Lundey near Reykjavík (Southwest)	0.03	0	Reykjavíkurborg
Lundey in Skagafjörður (Northwest)	0.06	0	Skagafjörður
Lundey in Skjálfandi (Northeast)	0.02	0	Norðurþing
Málmey	2.4	0	Skagafjörður
Mánáreyjar, two small islands (Háey and Lágey) near Tjörnes (North)	0.08	0	Tjörneshreppur
Melrakkaey	0.73	0	Grundarfjörður
Nesbjörg, in Álftafjörður in the Eastfjords	0.38	0	Múlaþing
Nýey, the name given to an island that formed in a volcanic eruption in 1783 but disappeared soon after that; the tiny skerry called Eldeyjarboði (see above) may be its remnants	0.0	0	Reykjanesbær
Papey	2.0	0	Djúpavogshreppur
Rockalldrangur	0.00078	0	disputed
Skáleyjar, a group of around 150 small islands in Breiðafjörður (West)	—N/a	0	Reykhólahreppur
Suðurey	0.2	0	Vestmannaeyjabær
Súlnasker	0.03	0	Vestmannaeyjabær
Surtsey, the second largest of the Westman Islands and Iceland's southernmost point, formed in a volcanic eruption in 1963; coastal erosion has reduced its surface area from 2.7 km^{2} at the end of the eruption to 2.5 km^{2} in 1975 and only 1.2 km^{2} in 2018.	1.2	0	Vestmannaeyjabær
Svefneyjar, a group of 63 small islands in Breiðafjörður (West)	—N/a	0	Reykhólahreppur
Sviðnur, a group of over 20 small islands in northern Breiðafjörður (West)	—N/a	0	Reykhólahreppur
Viðey, the largest of five historic islands off the mainland coast near Reykjavík (the others being Akurey, Engey, Lundey and Þerney)	1.7	0	Reykjavíkurborg
Vigur	0.4	<10 (2019)	Súðavíkurhreppur
Þerney	0.4	0	Reykjavíkurborg
Æðey	1.2	<10 (2019)	Ísafjarðarbær

== Formerly disputed islands ==
Island	Area (km^{2})	Population	Other claimants
Jan Mayen	377	0 (up to 35 non-permanent residents)	Norway
Greenland	2.1 million	56,653	Norway Denmark

== See also ==
- Extreme points of Iceland
- List of islands in the Atlantic Ocean
- List of islands
