= Stórhöfði =

Peninsula in Iceland

Coordinates: 63.399022°N 20.288315°W

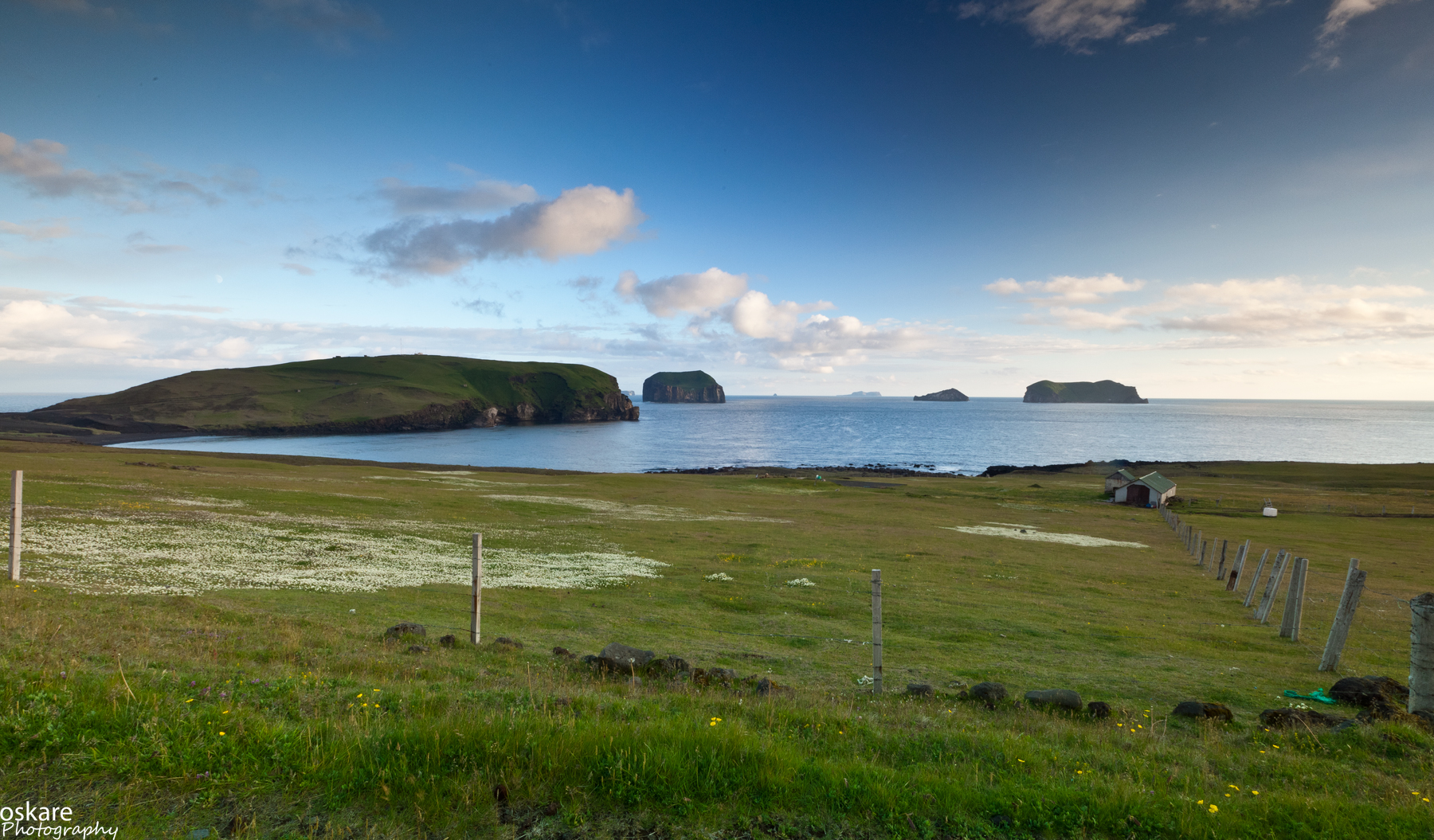
Stórhöfði, Suðurey, Brandur and Álsey (L to R) from Heimaey

Stórhöfði (Icelandic pronunciation: [ˈstourˌhœvðɪ]) is a peninsula and the southernmost point of Heimaey, the largest island in the Vestmannaeyjar archipelago, in Iceland. It is claimed to be the windiest place in Europe, and holds the record for the lowest on land observation of air pressure in Europe. The name means great cape and is also the name of a street in Reykjavík's Höfði industrial area.

Stórhöfði is the location of one of the oldest lighthouses in Iceland, having operated since 1906. Weather observations began at the lighthouse in 1921, which, since 1940, have been conducted at night too.
