= Geldungur =

Island in Iceland

Coordinates: 63°20′6.16″N 20°24′5.52″W

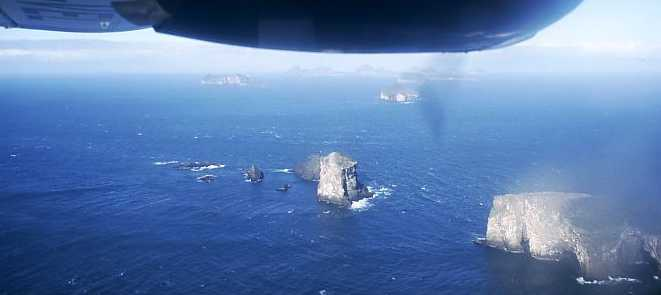
Centered in the image is Geldungur.

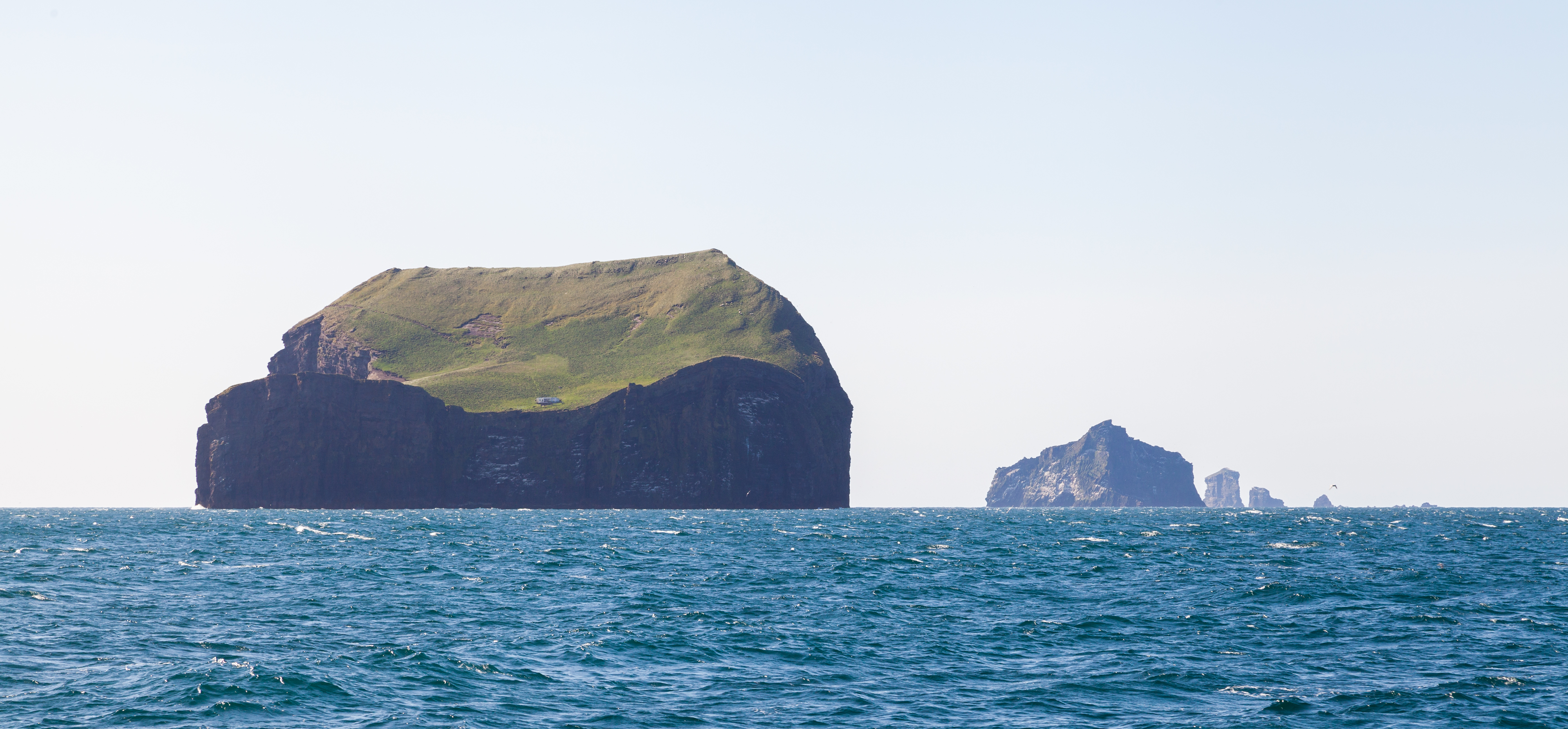
Suðurey, Hellisey, Súlnasker and Geldungur islands

Geldungur (Icelandic pronunciation: [ˈcɛltuŋkʏr̥]) is a small, uninhabited island in the Vestmann Islands, south of Iceland.
