= Ágústsson =

Ágústsson is an Icelandic patronymic surname, literally meaning "son of Ágúst". Notable people with the name include:

- Baldur Ágústsson, Icelandic businessman
- Bergur Elías Ágústsson (born 1963), Icelandic politician
- Bogi Ágústsson (born 1952), Icelandic television journalist
- Einar Ágústsson (1922–1986), Icelandic politician
- Guðni Ágústsson (born 1949), Icelandic politician
- Herbert H. Ágústsson (1926–2017), Icelandic composer and hornist
