= Högna Sigurðardóttir =

Icelandic architect (1929-2017)

- Born: 6 July 1929; Vestmannaeyjar, Kingdom of Iceland
- Died: 10 February 2017 (age 87); Reykjavík, Iceland
- Other name: Hogna Sigurdardottir-Anspach
- Occupation: Architect
- Relatives: Sólveig Anspach (daughter)

Högna Sigurðardóttir (6 July 1929 – 10 February 2017) was a leading Icelandic architect. She was the first woman to design a house in Iceland. She spent most of her professional career in France.

== Biography ==
Born on July 6, 1929, in a small fishing village in the volcanic island cluster of Vestmannaeyjar, just south of Iceland, Högna Sigurðardóttir made the decision early on to leave home and study architecture in Paris where she eventually established a practice.

In 1949, Högna Sigurðardóttir became the first Icelander to study at the École des Beaux-Arts in Paris. She there met here future husband, Gerhardt Anspach, with who she had two daughters: the director Sólveig Anspach and Thorunn.

Shortly after graduating in 1960, she designed a residential building in the Westman Islands, so becoming the first woman to design a building in Iceland. She was not, however, the first Icelandic woman to study architecture (that honor goes to Halldóra Briem). She came to early prominence in Iceland, both for her daring architectural style and for breaking the glass ceiling in a field dominated by men at the time.

She went on to build other residential buildings in Reykjavík and Kópavogur, installing furniture of her own design and adding gardens on the roofs as a means of creating an affinity with the natural surroundings. Her fine appreciation of landscape and nature can be seen even more vividly in the residential building at Bakkaflöt 1 in Garðabær. Inspired by the look of a traditional Icelandic turf house, Högna Sigurðardóttir made creative use of modern methods and materials in completing the work. In 2000, the building was picked out in an international review as one of the 100 most noteworthy buildings of the 20th century in Northern and Central Europe.

Högna's designs are considered as modern and bold.

== Career ==
=== Style ===
Högna's work is known for its bold expression and uncompromising character. Classified as Modern Brutalist Architecture, she primarily utilizes raw concrete in her designs. Materials such as natural stone, wood, and leather were also used in many of her designs. Her work became prominent through her integration of structure and interior as a whole; additionally, she designed specialized parts of her projects including furnishings, furniture, and even flowerpots. As homage to her Icelandic roots, she also installed things like rooftop gardens.

=== Projects ===
Högna is praised for her merging of landscape, form, and space. While she worked in Paris, some of her most distinct projects are located in Iceland. One of her most popular projects, The Bakkaflöt house (1965–68), is considered one of the hundred most remarkable buildings of the twentieth century in "World Architecture: a Critical Mosaic." Using prominent Brutalist techniques and a contemporary use of concrete along with references to ancient Icelandic building heritage, The Bakkaflöt house dissolves into its surrounding landscape. It is located on a small plot in Garðabær where the exterior form of the house is covered by artificial hills, rending only the flat roof visible. The interior revolves around a main living room which is defined by a large skylight and fireplace. vertical and horizontal components define the house's features: intimate built-in reading nooks to floor-to-ceiling sliding glass doors. Raw concrete, iron, carved hardwood, and leather provide a comfortable and warm spatial and textural experience.

== Appreciation and awards ==
In 1967, together with the French architect Adrien Fainsilber, Högna Sigurðardóttir won the first prize for designing a large-scale university development at Villetaneuse in the northern suburbs of Paris. Icelandic newspapers covered her award at great length; bringing prominence to her in Iceland.

In connection with the Honorary Medal for Visual Arts which Högna Sigurðardóttir was awarded in 2007 by the Akureyri Art Museum, it was stated that she had made a "unique lifetime contribution to Iceland architecture" and that her architecture was "more closely linked to Icelandic landscape, nature and heritage than the work of most contemporary architects."

In 2008, Högna Sigurðardóttir was elected an honorary member of the Association of Iceland.

She died in Reykjavík.

== Literature ==
- Hogna Sigurdardottir-Anspach: Revealing the Social Content: Birting Hins Felagslega Inntaks, Museum of Finnish Architecture. ISBN 951-9229-76-0.
