= Stormy Weather (2003 French-Icelandic film) =

2003 film

- Film poster
- Directed by: Sólveig Anspach
- Written by: Sólveig Anspach; Roger Bohbot; Pierre-Erwan Guillaume; Cécile Vargaftig
- Produced by: Þorfinnur Ómarsson; Baltasar Kormákur
- Starring: Élodie Bouchez
- Cinematography: Benoît Dervaux
- Edited by: Anne Riegel
- Music by: Alexandre Desplat
- Distributed by: Diaphana Films
- Release date: 19 September 2003
- Running time: 91 minutes
- Countries: France; Iceland
- Languages: French; English

Stormy Weather (Icelandic: Stormviðri) is a 2003 French-Icelandic drama film directed by Sólveig Anspach and starring Élodie Bouchez. It was screened in the Un Certain Regard section at the 2003 Cannes Film Festival.

== Plot summary ==
Cora, a young psychiatrist, has recently started handling the case of a young woman who refuses to speak. No one at the hospital knows her name or where she's come from.

Cora feels as though the woman is calling out to her. She becomes quite attached to her and establishes a relationship that slips further and further away from prescribed therapeutic procedure.

It's then discovered that the young woman is a foreigner. Her name is Loa and she comes from Vestmannaeyar, a small Icelandic island.

== Cast ==
- Élodie Bouchez - Cora
- Didda Jónsdóttir - Loa
- Baltasar Kormákur - Einar
- Ingvar Eggert Sigurðsson - Gunnar (as Ingvar E. Sigurðsson)
- Christophe Sermet - Romain
- Natan Cogan - Grandfather
- Christian Crahay - Le médecin-chef
- Tinna Gudmundsdóttir - Tinna
- Davíð Örn Halldórsson - David
- Ólafía Hrönn Jónsdóttir - Gudrun
- Marina Tomé - Mademoiselle Ramirez
