= Sólveig Anspach =

Icelandic film director

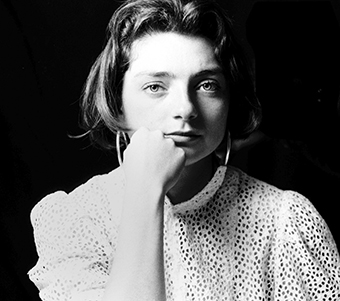
- Born: 8 December 1960; Vestmannaeyjar, Iceland
- Died: 7 August 2015 (aged 54); Drôme, France
- Occupations: Film director Screenwriter
- Years active: 1998–2015

Sólveig Anspach (8 December 1960 – 7 August 2015) was an Icelandic-French film director and screenwriter. Born to a German-Romanian father Gerhard Anspach and an Icelandic mother Högna Sigurðardóttir, she spent most of her life living and working in France. After studying philosophy and clinical psychology in Paris, she enrolled in La Fémis and graduated with a diploma in directing in 1989. Her film Stormy Weather was screened in the Un Certain Regard section at the 2003 Cannes Film Festival. Anspach died of breast cancer on 7 August 2015 at the age of 54.

== Filmography ==
Year	Title	Credited as		Notes
Year	Title	Director	Screenwriter	Notes
1988	La Tire	Yes		Documentary film
1989	Par amour	Yes		Documentary short film
1990	Les Îles Vestmannaeyar	Yes		Documentary short film
1991	Sandrine, une autre vie	Yes		Documentary short film
1991	Le Chemin de Kjölur	Yes		Documentary short film
1992	Sandrine à Paris	Yes		Documentary film
1993	Vizir et Vizirette	Yes		Short film
1995	Le Toucher	Yes		Documentary film Part of Allô la Terre series
1995	Les Loups	Yes		Documentary film Part of Allô la Terre series
1995	Bonjour, c'est pour un sondage	Yes		Documentary film
1995	Sarajevo, paroles de casques bleus	Yes		Documentary film
1995	Bistrik, Sarajevo	Yes		Documentary short film
1996	Les Origines	Yes		Documentary film Part of Allô la Terre series
1997	Le Théâtre des Marionnettes	Yes		Documentary film Part of Allô la Terre series
1997	Barbara, you're not guilty...	Yes		Documentary film
1998	Que personne ne bouge !	Yes		Documentary film
1999	Haut les cœurs!	Yes	Yes	Flanders International Film Festival Ghent - Best Director; Nominated—César Award for Best First Feature Film
2001	Made in the USA	Yes	Yes	Documentary film 2001 Cannes Film Festival - François Chalais Prize
2001	Reykjavik, des elfes dans la ville	Yes		Documentary short film
2002	La Revue Deschamps Makeïef	Yes		Documentary film
2003	Stormy Weather	Yes	Yes	Nominated—2003 Cannes Film Festival - Prix Un certain regard
2004	Les Européens	Yes		Segment: Jane by the Sea
2004	Faux tableaux dans vrais paysages islandais	Yes		Documentary film
2005	Le Secret	Yes		Documentary film
2006	Manon, Montreuil-sous-Bois, France	Yes		Documentary film
2006	Didda, Reykyavik, Islande	Yes		Documentary film
2008	Skrapp út (Back Soon)	Yes	Yes	Locarno International Film Festival - Variety Piazza Grande Award
2009	Christine	Yes	Yes	Documentary short film
2010	The Rebel, Louise Michel	Yes	Yes	Telefilm
2010	Anne et les tremblements	Yes	Yes	Short film
2012	Queen of Montreuil	Yes	Yes	Reykjavík International Film Festival - Audience Award; 69th Venice International Film Festival - Lina Mangiacapre Award
2013	Lulu femme nue	Yes	Yes	Nominated—César Award for Best Adaptation
2016	L'Effet aquatique	Yes	Yes	Cannes Film Festival - SACD Award (Directors' Fortnight); César Award for Best Original Screenplay
