= Framhaldsskólinn í Vestmannaeyjum =

Coordinates: 63°26.11′N 20°16.29′W

Framhaldsskólinn í Vestmannaeyjum, the comprehensive secondary school of Vestmannaeyjar, Iceland, was founded 1979 when the mechanical engineering, common trades (is. iðnskóli) and the higher education department of the secondary school merged into one.

Then in 1997, it also took over the school of maritime navigation.

Currently there are seven departments in the school: Natural sciences, social sciences, linguistics, job training (for disabled people), medical aide training, electrical engineering and mechanical engineering.

The school is also currently used as the teaching facility for the Vestmannaeyjar department of the University of Iceland and has hosted many remote lectures, to Ísafjörður and Bíldudalur as well as a few other countries.
