= Vestmannaeyjar Tunnel =

Proposed undersea tunnel in Iceland

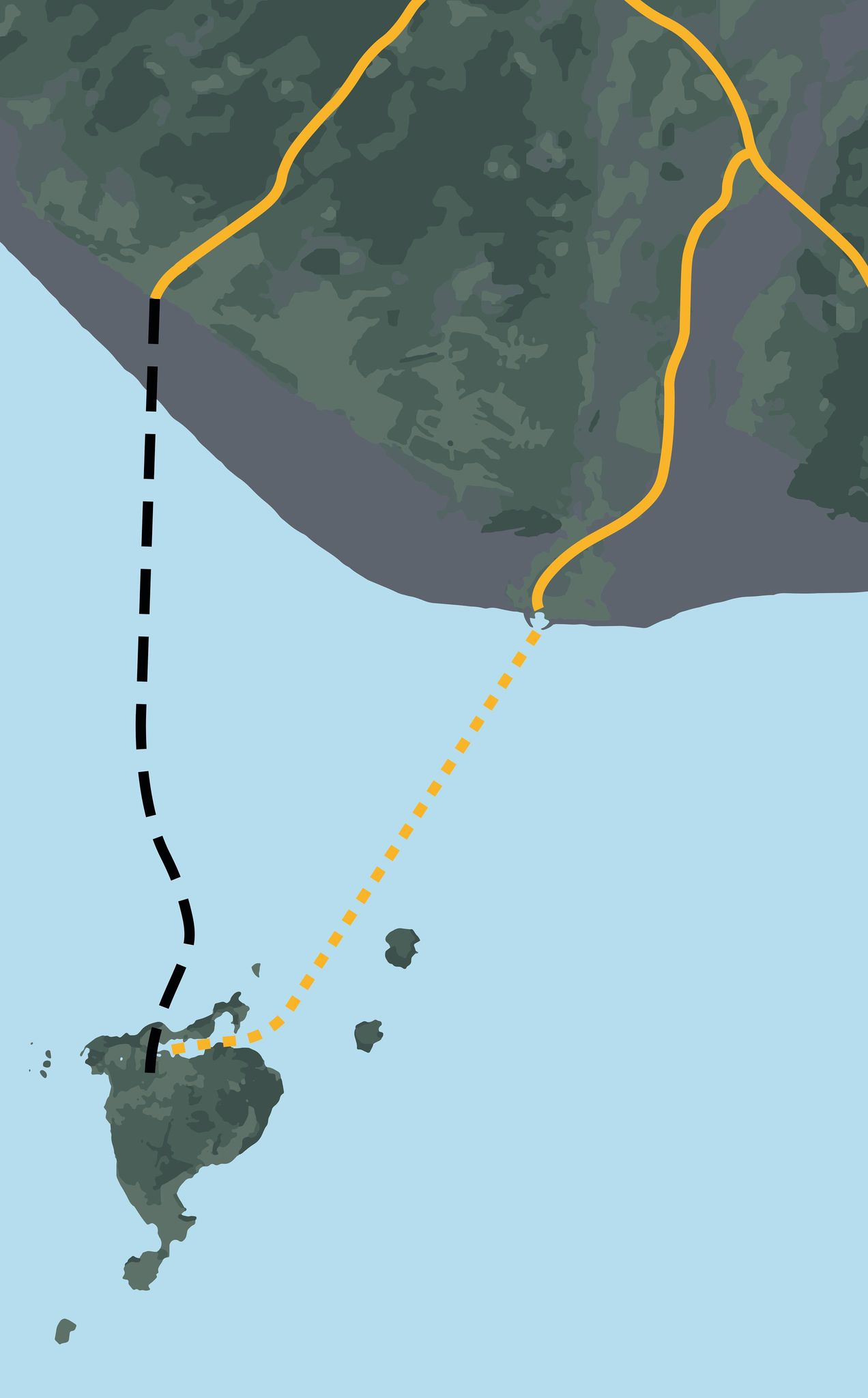
- Black: possible tunnel route. Yellow: existing road and ferry routes.

Overview
- Location: Southern Region, Iceland

Technical
- Length: 18–26 km (11–16 mi)

The Vestmannaeyjar Tunnel (Icelandic: Vestmannaeyjagöng) is a proposed undersea tunnel in Iceland, linking the archipelago Vestmannaeyjar to the Icelandic mainland. As of 2025, the only connections to Vestmannaeyjar are the ferry Herjólfur and seasonal flights to Vestmannaeyjar Airport.

== History ==
In 1989, MP Árni Johnsen from Vestmannaeyjar proposed a resolution to study the possibility of a tunnel to Vestmannaeyjar.

In 2007, a report from Vegagerðin estimated the cost of a tunnel at 50–80 billion ISK, with research alone costing 115–275 million.

In 2017, four MPs from the Independence Party proposed a resolution that would establish a group to study the proposed tunnel.

A 2020 estimate put the societal benefit of the tunnel at 95.4 billion ISK, compared to an inflation-adjusted cost (from 2007) of 90.5–139.2 billion.

In 2023, Minister of Infrastructure Sigurður Ingi Jóhannsson created a group to study the tunnel.
