= Heimaey stave church =

Church building in Iceland

Coordinates: 63.4443°N 20.2612°W

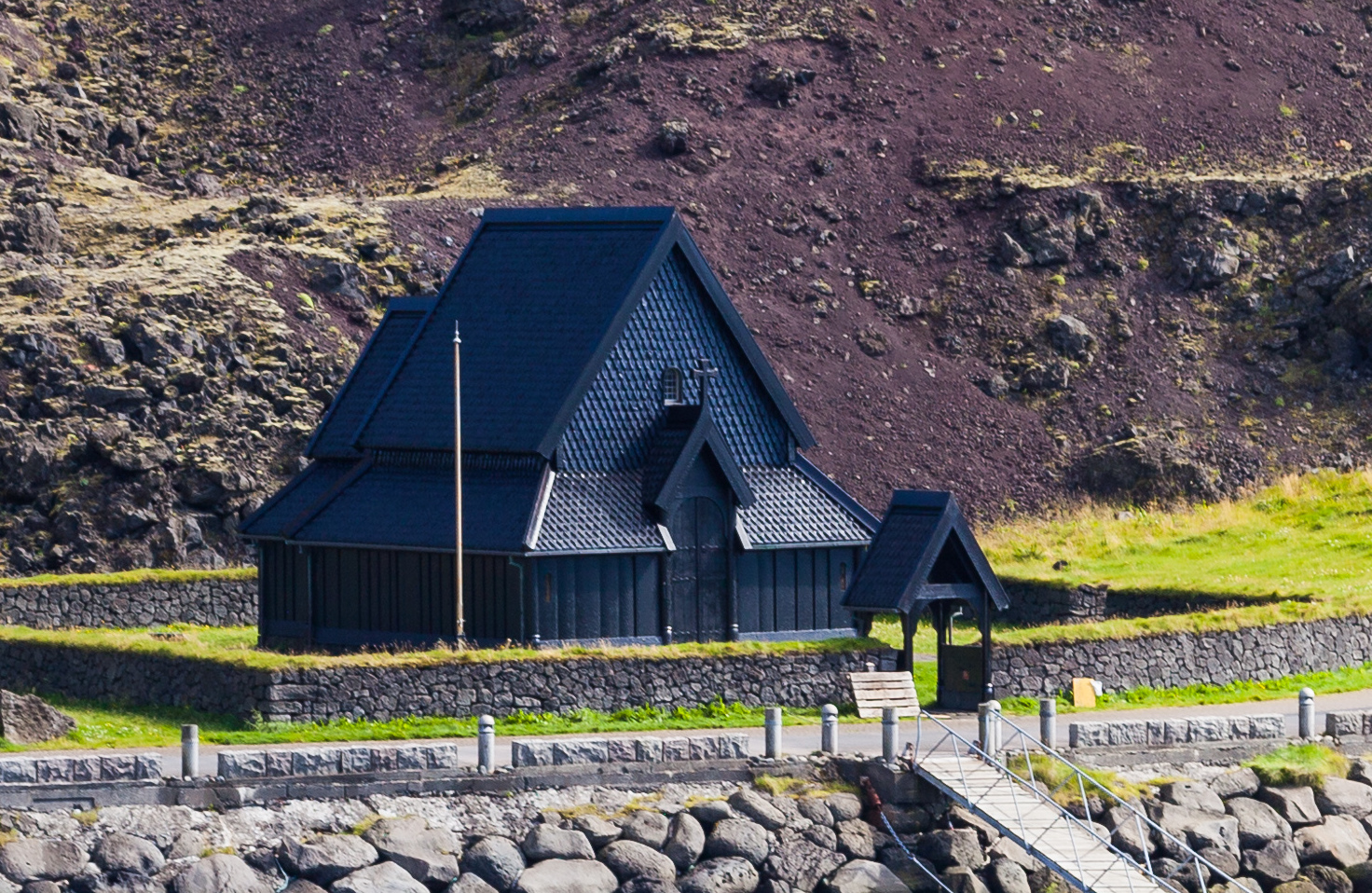
Heimaey stave church

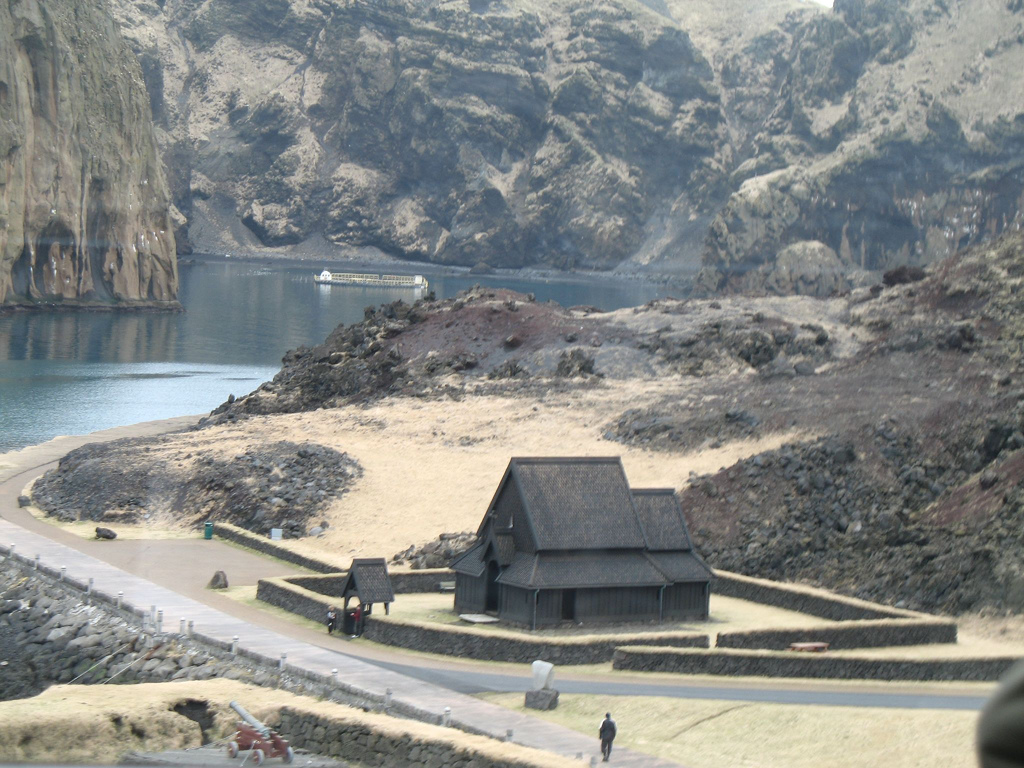
Heimaey stave church

Heimaey Stave Church (Stafkirkjan) is a close replica of Haltdalen stave church situated in the Skansinn area of the harbour of Vestmannaeyjabær on Heimaey, Vestmannaeyjar, Iceland.

== History ==
The church was completed on July 30, 2000, and was a gift from Norway to Iceland in connection with the millennial anniversary of the conversion of Iceland to Christianity by Olav Tryggvason in the year 1000. Developing from a suggestion by the Icelandic government, the Norwegian state presented Iceland with a replica of the Haltdalen Stave Church (Haltdalen stavkirke), originally from around the 1170s. The first church known on Iceland was a post church and not a stave church.

The replica was erected by the harbour of Vestmannaeyjabær in the Vestmannaeyjar, in an area formed by the lava of the 1973 eruption of Eldfell. The replica was undertaken by the Norwegian Institute for Cultural Heritage Research as a three-year research and reconstruction project from 1998 to 2000 under the leadership of professor Elisabeth Seip, Head of Research at the Norwegian Institute for Cultural Heritage Research.

The church was constructed in Lom Municipality, Norway from materials deliberately drawn widely from around Norway, including timber from Røros, shingles from Odalen, tar from Skjåk, wrought iron from Vågå, and a doorstep from Holtålen. A gallery was added around the outside of the building, inspired by other stave churches, to provide the building with extra strength against the stormy weather of the Vestmannaeyjar. The church was built and consecrated in summer 2000, and was completed on 30 July 2000. The project was supported by a Norwegian government grant of 5.5m Norwegian kroner; Icelandic government funding for the redevelopment of the Skansinn area of Vestmannaeyjarbær as a heritage area; and some private sponsorship was also involved, most importantly that the Icelandic company Eimskip shipped the church to Iceland for free.

The National Church of Norway also gave an altar piece. It is replica of the St Olav frontal, one of the finest surviving medieval Norwegian works of art, undertaken under the leadership of Terje Nordsted. The original is at Nidaros Cathedral but is said (without any substantial supporting evidence) once to have been situated in the Haltdalen stave church.

Heimaey Stave Church (replica of the Haltdalen Stave Church)
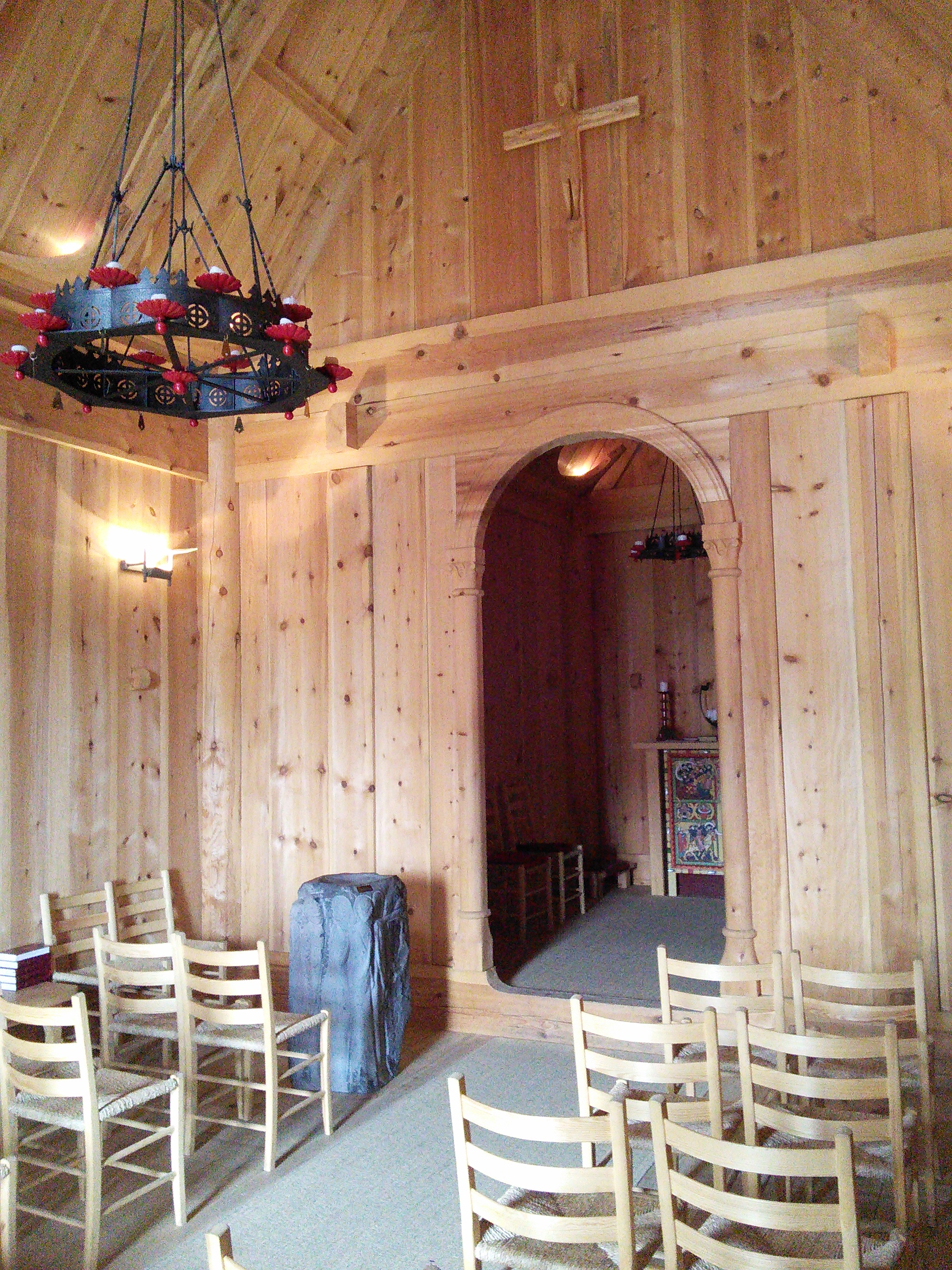
Nave of the church, showing entrance to the choir.

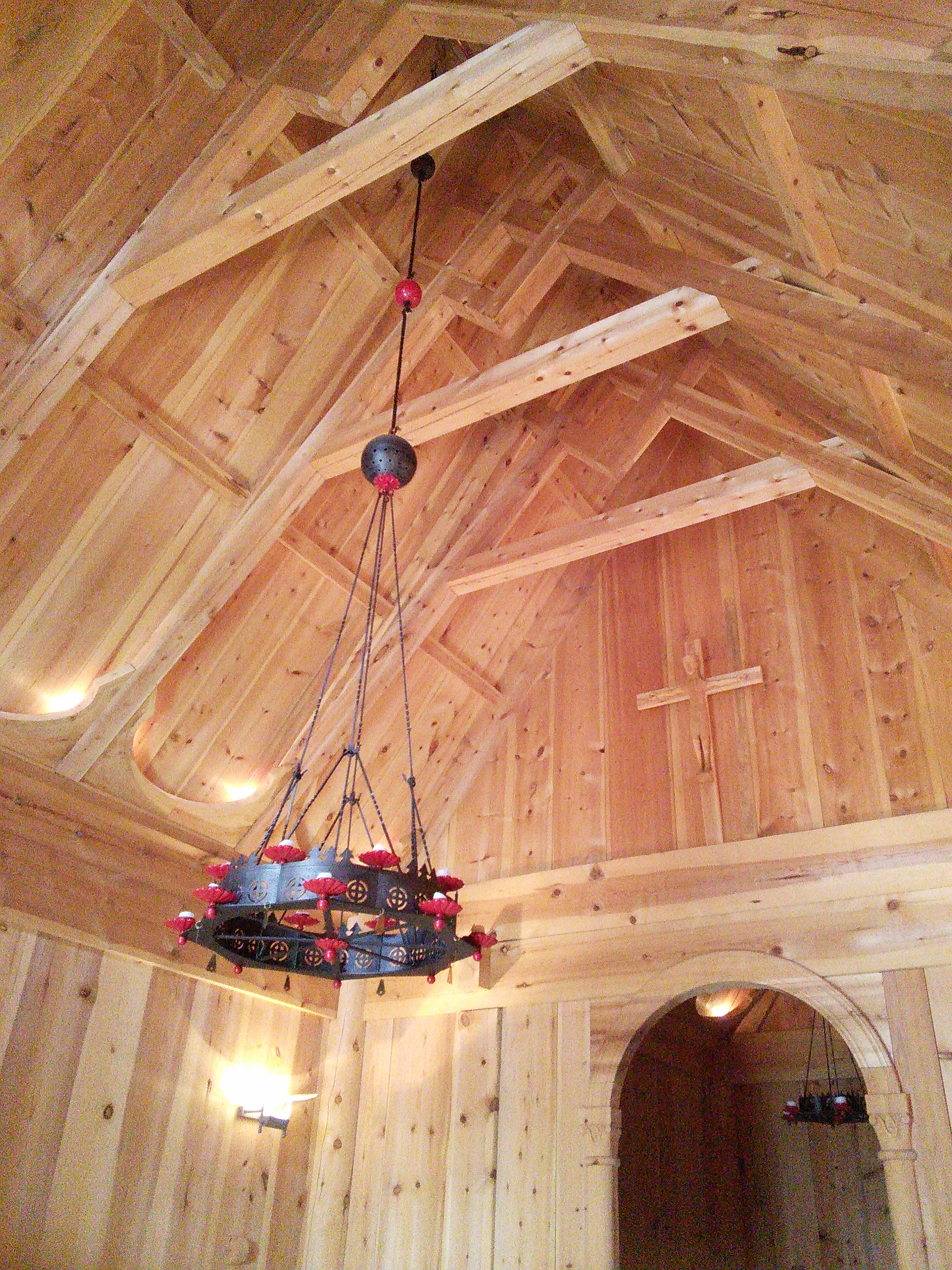
Roof of the nave.

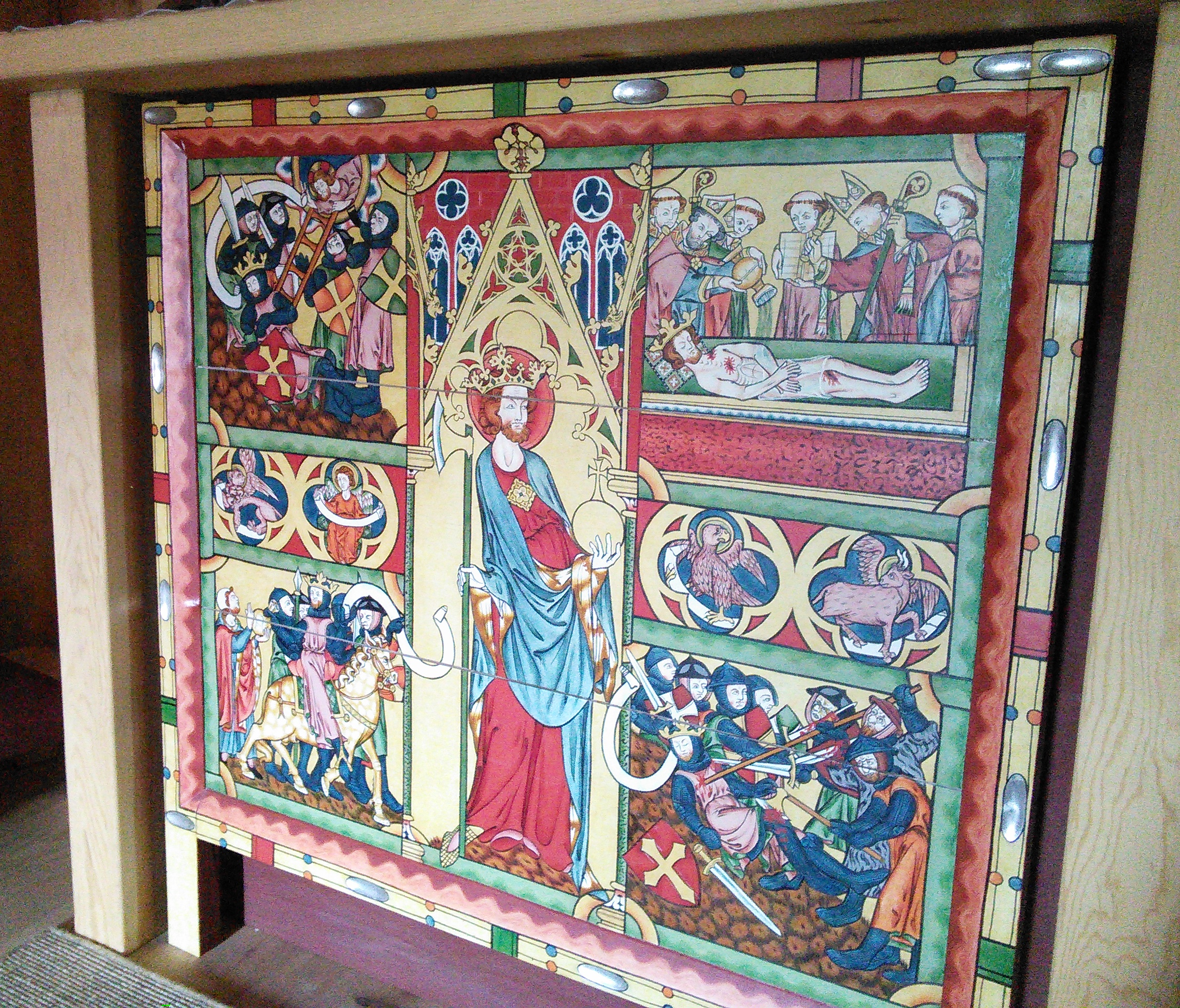
Replica of the St Olav frontal.

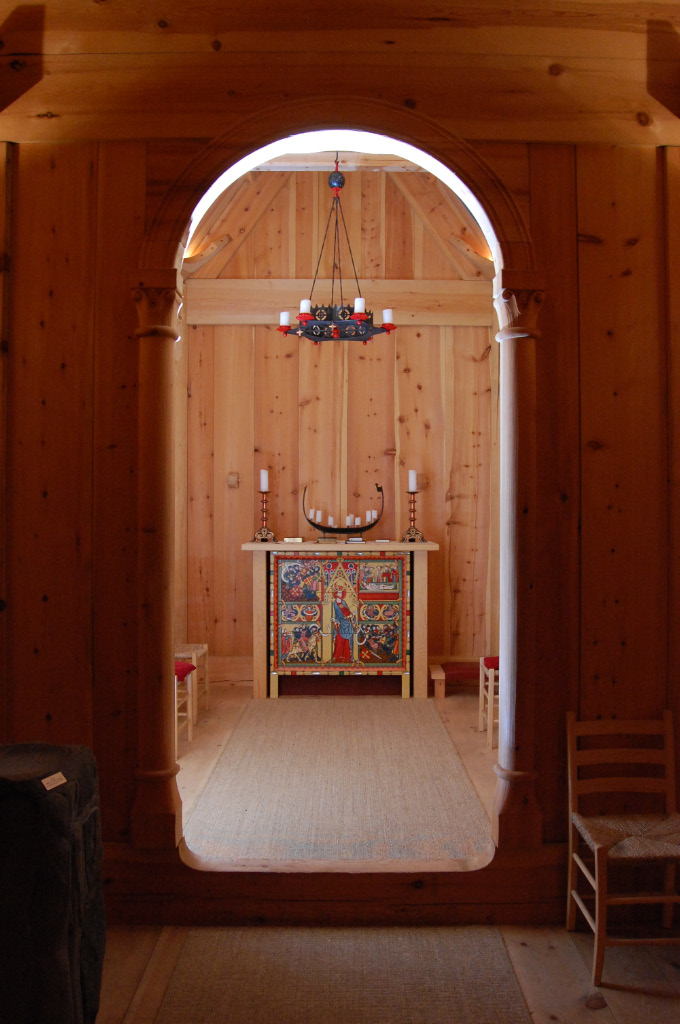
Heimaey Stave Church altar
