= Kolfinna Kristófersdóttir =

Icelandic fashion model

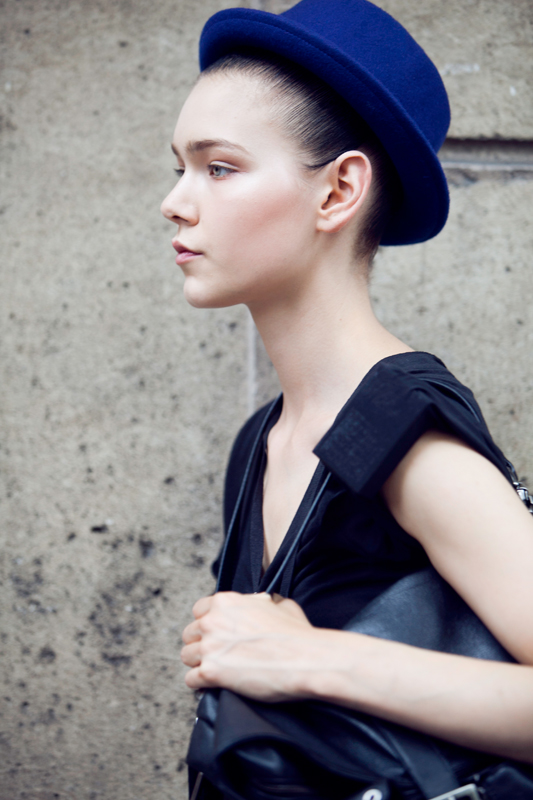
- Kristófersdóttir in 2012
- Born: Iceland
- Modeling information
- Height: 5 ft 11 in (180 cm)
- Hair color: Dark brown (dyed black)
- Eye color: Gray
- Agency: Eskimo (Iceland); Next (London, Milan, New York, Paris)

Kolfinna Kristófersdóttir is a fashion model from Iceland.

== Early life ==
Kolfinna Kristófersdóttir is originally from Vestmannaeyjar, Iceland. She was working in a clothing shop when she was scouted by the local modeling agency Eskimo. In 2011 she won second place at the Ford Models contest for Iceland. Internationally she is represented by Next.

== Career ==
Kolfinna was first noticed internationally at age 19 when she walked exclusively for Marc Jacobs in New York during Fall/Winter 2012. She next walked London and Milan, winning the London Walk-Off poll at Style.com with 42% of the vote and being featured as a Top 10 Newcomer by Models.com. Shows included Acne, Christopher Kane, Fendi, Marni, Prada, Topshop, and Versace. Kolfinna had to sit Paris out because of a foot sprain, which she blamed on the extremely high heels she wore in London, aggravated subsequently by the intensity of her schedule in Milan.

Kolfinna has been on the cover of Russh (June–July 2012), Vision China (June 2012) and i-D (Fall 2012).

== Personal life ==
Kolfinna currently lives in Reykjavík. She usually wears black, white, red and gray. She would like to be a chef and own her own restaurant some day. Her favorite music includes electronic acts like Burial and Aphex Twin.
