= Bjarnarey =

Island in Iceland

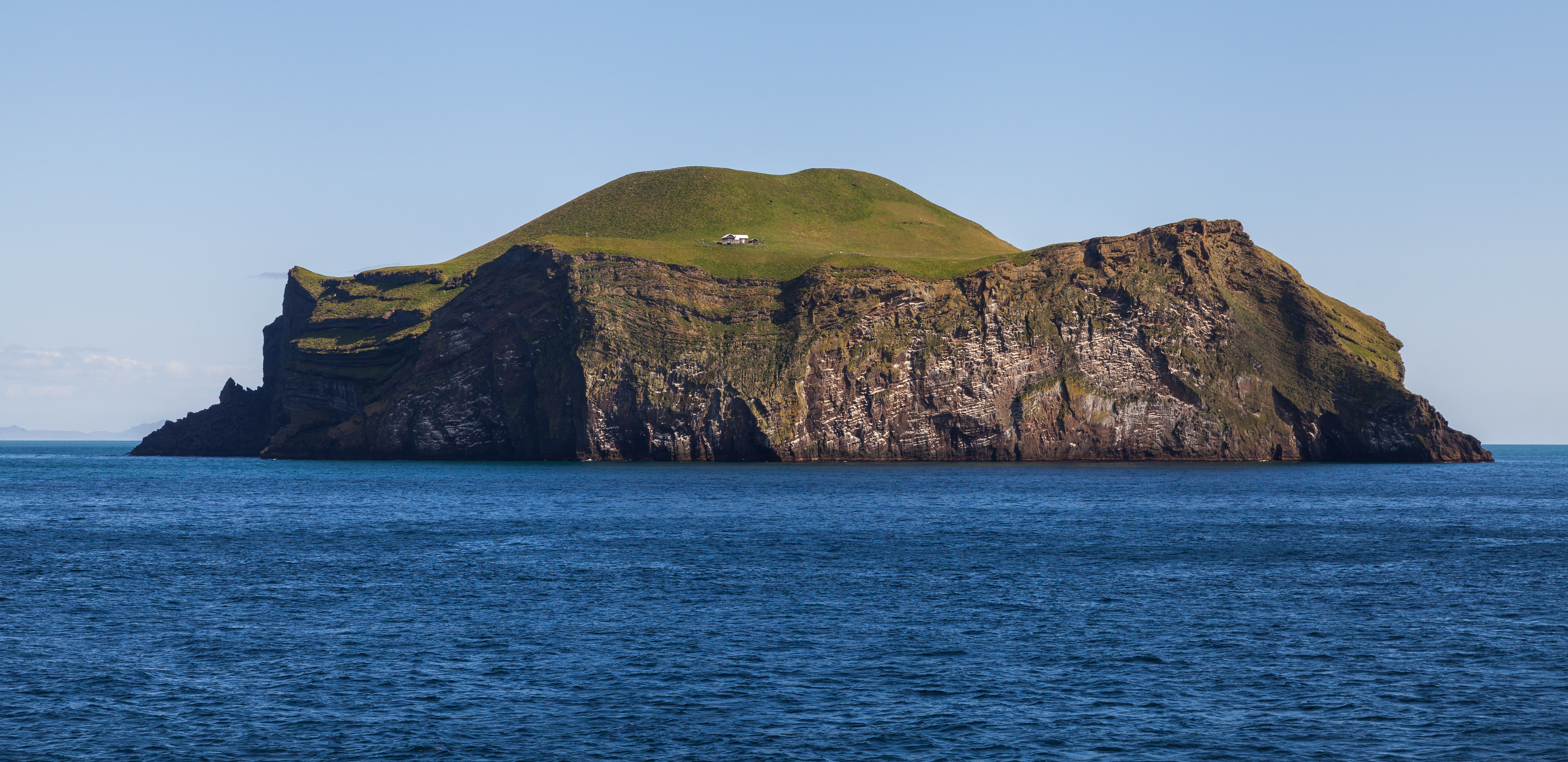
- Bjarnarey

Geography
- Location: Atlantic Ocean
- Coordinates: 63°26.88′N 20°11.4′W
- Archipelago: Vestmannaeyjar
- Total islands: 15
- Area: 0.32 km^{2} (0.12 sq mi)

Administration
- Iceland

Demographics
- Population: 0

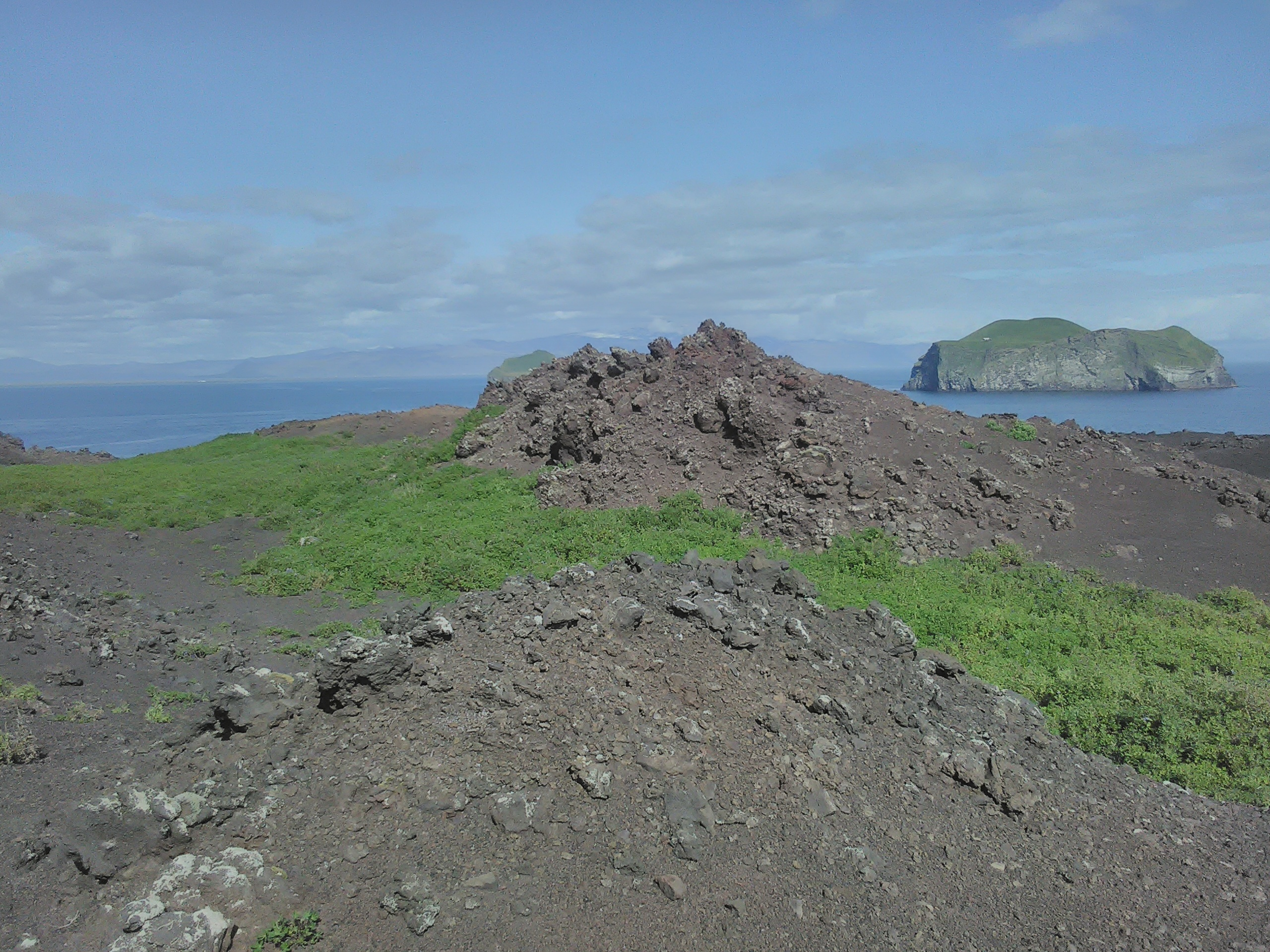
Volcanism in the south of Iceland:Bjarnarey, Eldfellshraun and Eyjafjallajökull in the background

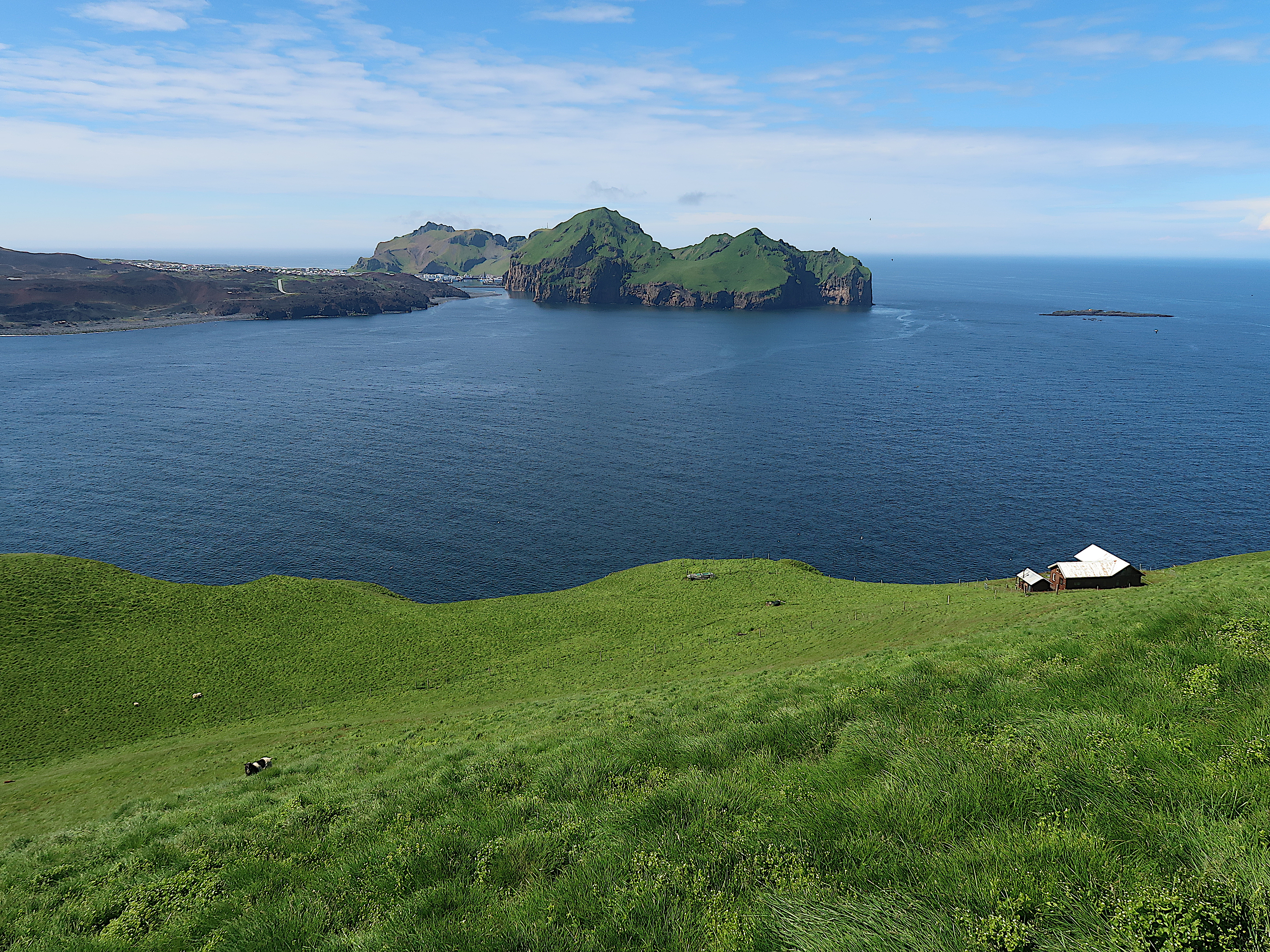
View from Bjarnarey to Heimaey

Bjarnarey (Icelandic pronunciation: [ˈpja(r)tnarˌeiː]) is a small, uninhabited island in the Vestmann Islands, south of Iceland. It is one of the 18 islands that make up the Vestmannaeyjar archipelago.
