= Bergur Elías Ágústsson =

Icelandic politician

Former mayor of Norðurþing, Iceland
- Incumbent
- Assumed office May 2006
- Preceded by: Reinhard Reynisson
- Succeeded by: Kristján Þór Magnússon

Personal details
- Born: 7 July 1963 (age 63) Vestmannaeyjar, Iceland
- Spouse: Bryndís Sigurðardóttir
- Education: University of Tromsø

Bergur Elías Ágústsson (born 7 July 1963) was the mayor of Norðurþing municipality. Bergur is best known for his fight to have a controversial silicon metal plant owned by PCC Group built in his province. He was one of the signatories of an MOU between PCC Group and Norðurþing which included giving the company numerous concessions in order to make the construction more attractive to the company. These concessions included a 40% discount on excise tariffs for the first ten years of operations, as well as a 50% lower property taxes than the legal limit. The company will also enjoy a 30% discount on road construction fees. Bergur currently works for the PCC Group.

He was appointed mayor of Norðurþing in 2006, having previously served as the mayor of Vestmannaeyjar municipality from 2003. Bergur is the former chairman of Eyþing, an association of the local governments in Eyjafjörður and Þingeyjarsýslur.
