= Vestmannaeyjar =

- Town and municipality
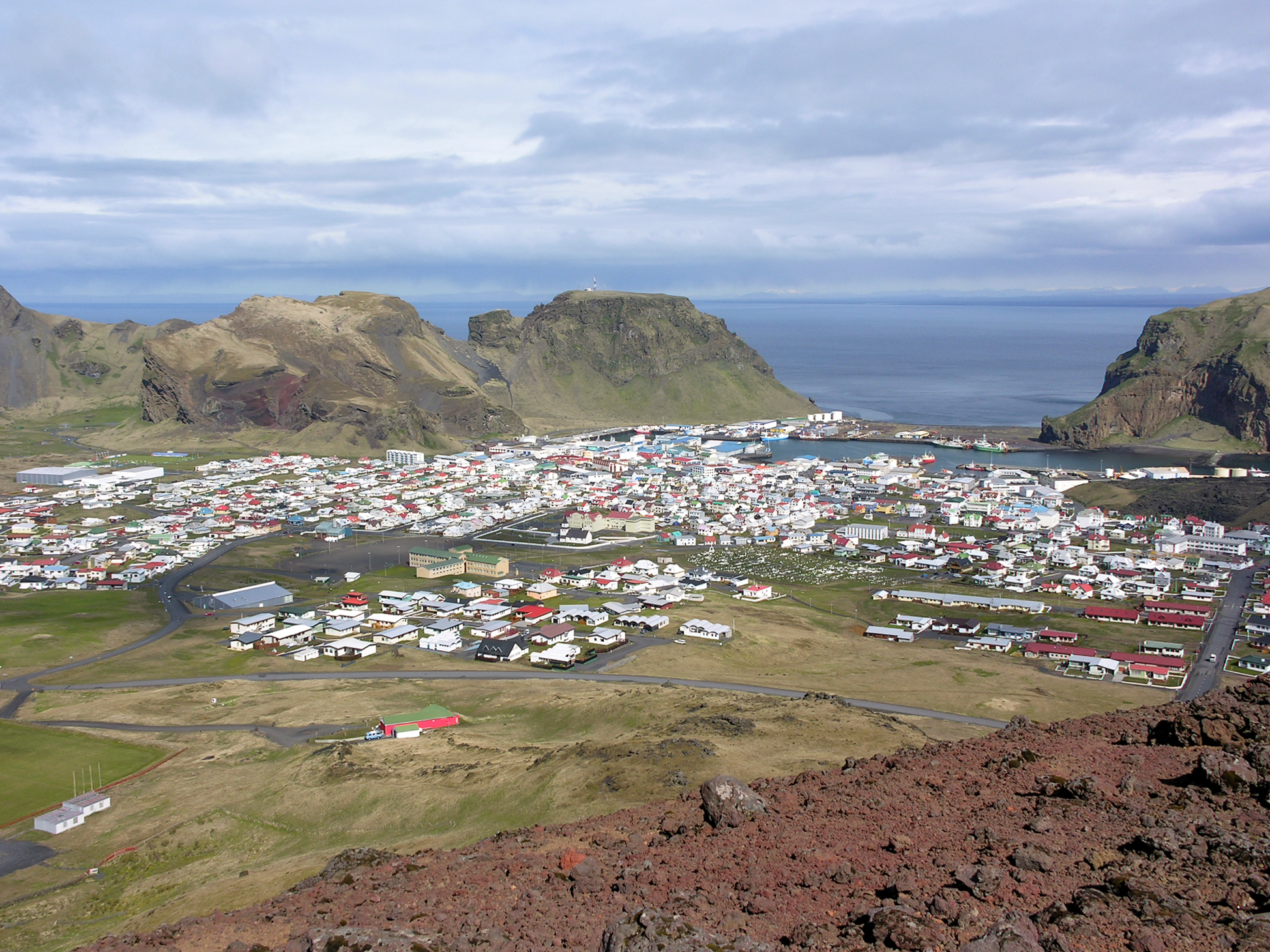
- View of Vestmannaeyjabær

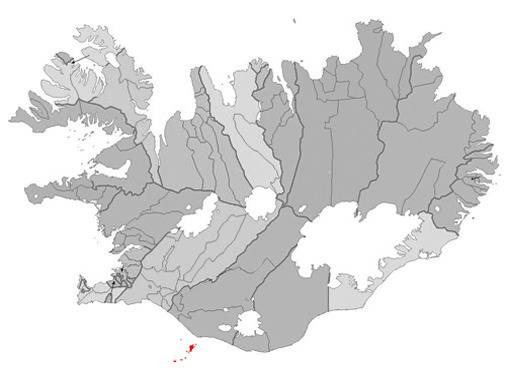
- Location of the Municipality of Vestmannaeyjar

- Location of Vestmannaeyjar in Iceland
- Coordinates: 63°25′00″N 20°17′00″W
- Country: Iceland
- Constituency: South Constituency
- Region: Southern Region
- County: Vestmannaeyjar (Note: Independent town)

Government
  - Mayor: Íris Róbertsdóttir (2022–present)

Area
  - Total: 17 km^{2} (6.6 sq mi)

Population (2024)
  - Total: 4,639
  - Density: 250.82/km^{2} (649.6/sq mi)
- Time zone: UTC+0 (GMT)
- Post code: IS-900, 902
- Website: www.vestmannaeyjar.is/en

Vestmannaeyjar (Icelandic pronunciation: [ˈvɛstˌmanːaˌeiːjar̥], sometimes anglicised as Westman Islands) is a municipality and archipelago off the south coast of Iceland.

The largest island, Heimaey, has a population of 4,537, most of whom live in the archipelago's main town, Vestmannaeyjabær. The other islands are uninhabited, although six have single hunting cabins. Vestmannaeyjar came to international attention in 1973 with the eruption of the Eldfell volcano, which destroyed many buildings and forced a month-long evacuation of the entire population to mainland Iceland. Approximately one-fifth of the town was destroyed before the lava flow was halted by the application of 6.8 billion litres (1.8 billion US gallons) of cold seawater.

== Geography ==
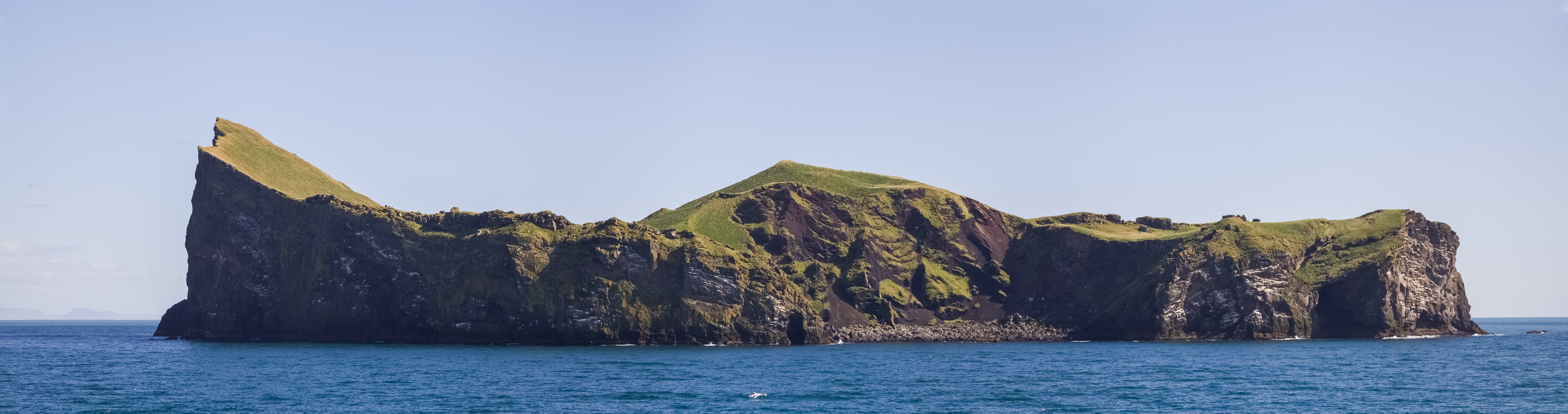
Elliðaey island

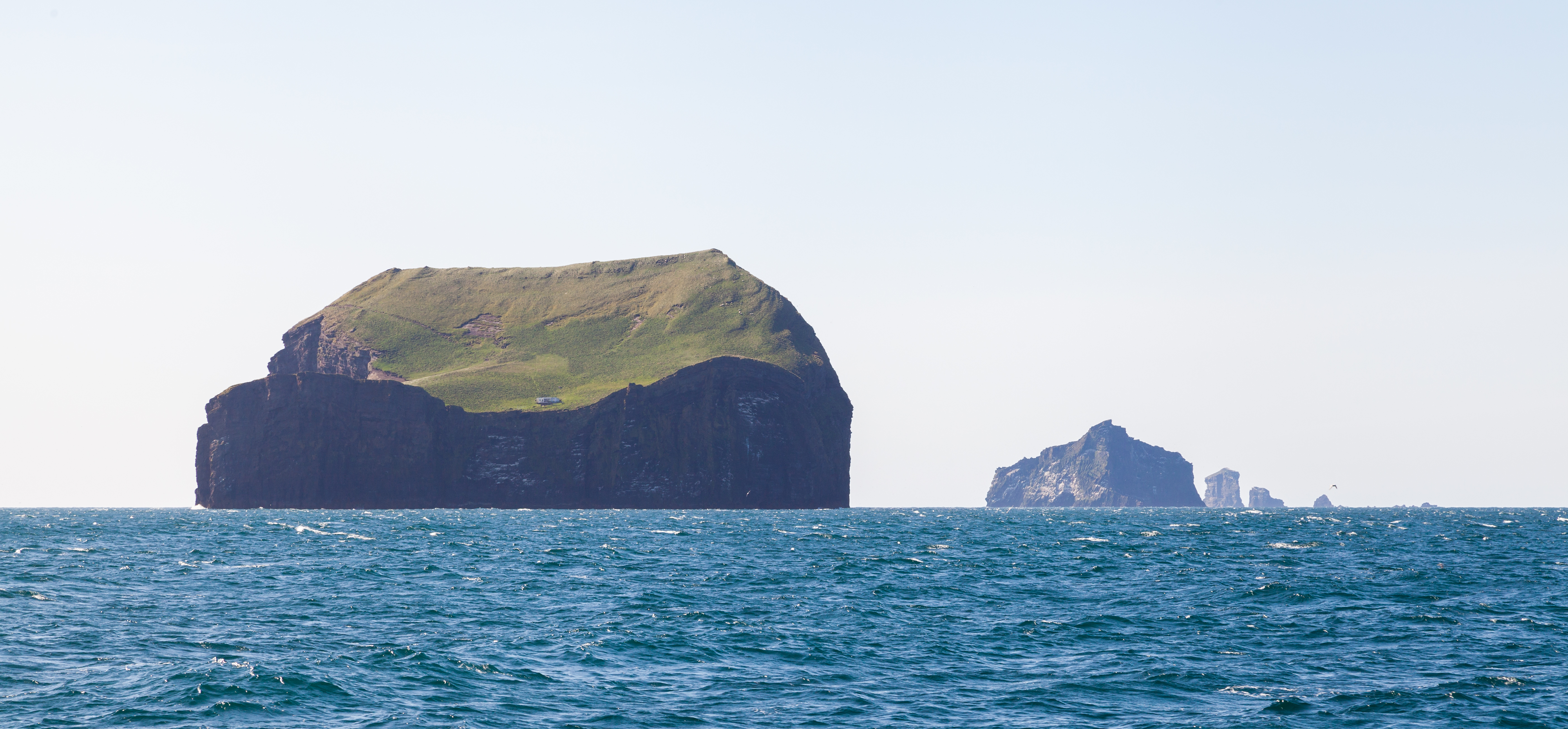
Suðurey, Hellisey, Súlnasker and Geldungur islands

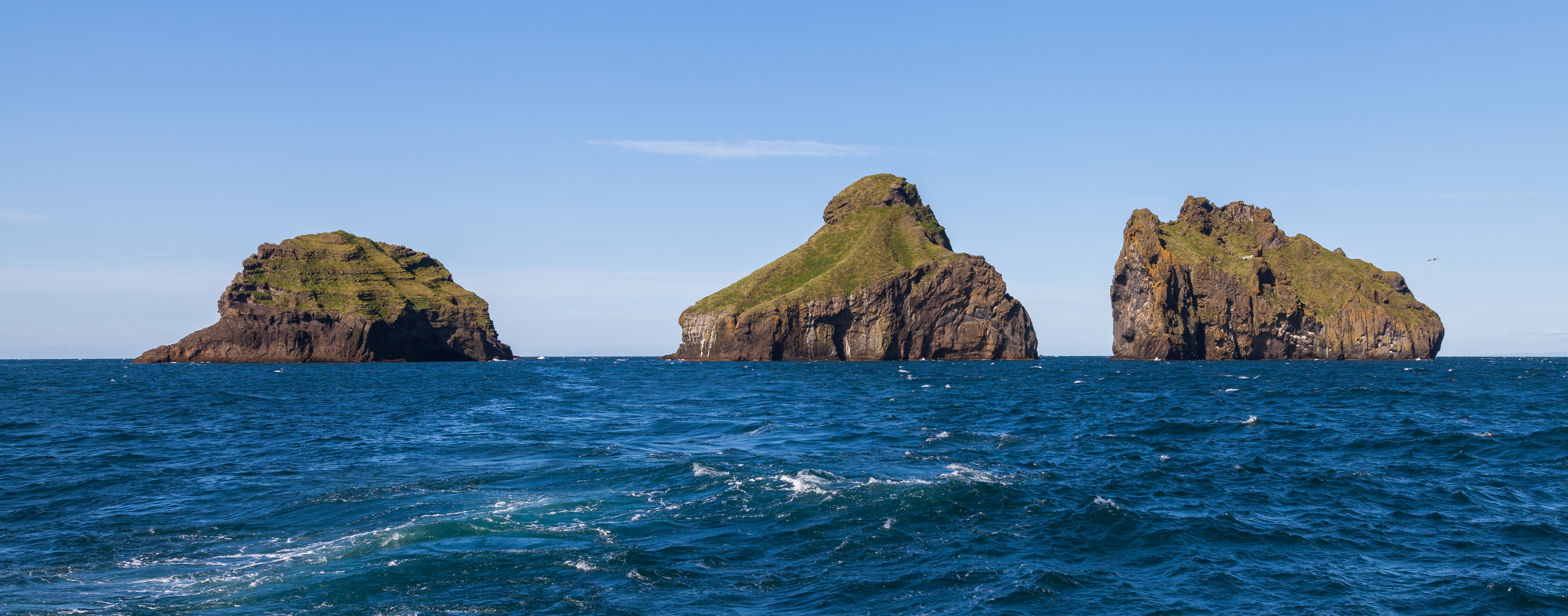
Smáeyjar islands

The Vestmannaeyjar archipelago is young in geological terms. The islands lie in the South Iceland volcanic zone (SIVZ) and have been formed by eruptions over the past 10,000–12,000 years. The volcanic system consists of 70–80 volcanoes, both above and below the sea.

Vestmannaeyjar comprises the following islands:

- Heimaey (13.4 km^{2} (5.2 sq mi))
- Surtsey (1.4 km^{2} (0.54 sq mi))
- Elliðaey (0.45 km^{2} (0.17 sq mi))
- Bjarnarey (0.32 km^{2} (0.12 sq mi))
- Álsey (0.25 km^{2} (0.097 sq mi))
- Suðurey (0.20 km^{2} (0.077 sq mi))
- Brandur (0.10 km^{2} (0.039 sq mi))
- Hellisey (0.10 km^{2} (0.039 sq mi))
- Súlnasker (0.03 km^{2} (0.012 sq mi))
- Geldungur (0.02 km^{2} (0.0077 sq mi))
- Geirfuglasker (0.02 km^{2} (0.0077 sq mi))
- The islands Hani Icelandic pronunciation: [ˈhaːnɪ], Hæna Icelandic pronunciation: [ˈhaiːna], Hrauney Icelandic pronunciation: [ˈr̥œːinˌeiː] and the skerry Grasleysa Icelandic pronunciation: [ˈkrasˌleiːsa] are called Smáeyjar (Icelandic pronunciation: [ˈsmauːˌeiːjar̥], small islands).

Total area: 16.3 square kilometres (6.3 square miles)

There are 18 islands and about 30 rock stacks and skerries. All the islands have been built up in submarine eruptions and consist of alternating layers of palagonite tuff and lava. The oldest geological formations are in the northern part of Heimaey ("Home Island"), the largest island and the only inhabited one. Basalt columns can be seen in places, and the sea has eroded the soft rock of the shoreline and scooped out coves and grottos, which are among the features of the islands.

There was a submarine eruption southeast of Hellisey in 1896. The next eruption began on 14 November 1963. It lasted about four years – one of the longest in Icelandic history – and gave birth to Surtsey, the 15th island in the group. In the eruption of 1973 that lasted for 155 days, Heimaey grew by about 2.1 square kilometres (0.81 square miles). The Vestmannaeyjar group is about 38 kilometres (24 miles) long and 29 kilometres (18 miles) broad, the closest point lying about 8 kilometres (5 miles) from the mainland.

== Biodiversity ==
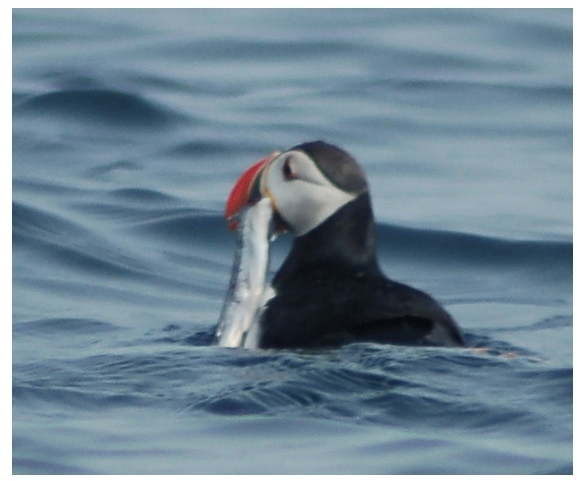
Puffin with capelin

There is a microclimate with generally little snow, but considerable rain. Owing to this, returning migratory birds are often first seen in the spring, and they set out from the islands in the autumn. All of Iceland's seabirds can be found in Vestmannaeyjar: the guillemot, gannet, kittiwake, Iceland gull, and puffin. The puffin is the most plentiful species and is the Vestmannaeyjar emblem. More than 30 species of birds nest in their millions in the cliffs and grassy ledges, and other species make irregular appearances.

There are about 150 plant species in the flora of the islands, and about 80 types of insects have been identified.

The waters around the Vestmannaeyjar contain some of the North Atlantic's fishing grounds. The two main commercially exploited species in Iceland, cod and haddock, are found in Vestmannaeyjar. Other species, such as flat-fish, herring and capelin, are also harvested as they migrate through the area in the autumn and winter. Lobsters and ocean perch are found in the deep water to the southeast of the islands. Seals, small types of whales and other marine species are also present around the islands.

The townspeople have a tradition of guiding stray puffins to safe locations.

== Climate ==
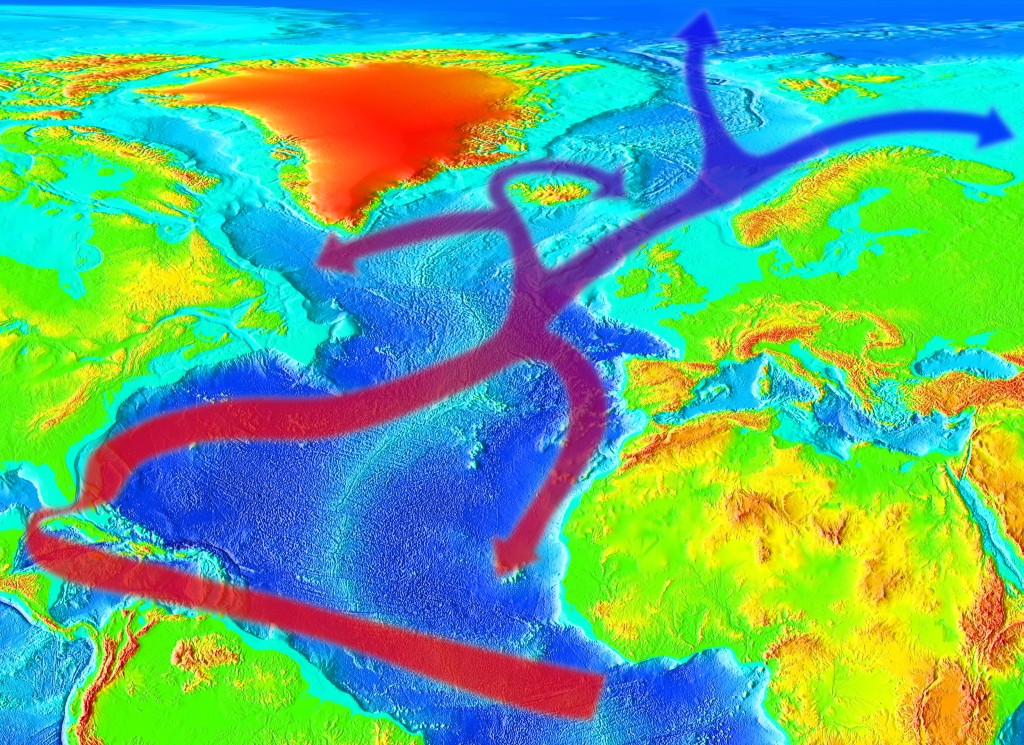
Gulf Stream route around Iceland

With extremely high precipitation considering the latitude, Vestmannaeyjar features a subpolar oceanic climate (Cfc) under the Köppen climate classification. It is often very windy in the islands, and the highest wind speed measured in Iceland, measuring at 61 metres per second (140 mph; 220 km/h), which was recorded in Stórhöfði, the southernmost of the island's two major peninsulas. The main wind directions are easterly and south-easterly.

Climate data for Vestmannaeyjar
Month	Jan	Feb	Mar	Apr	May	Jun	Jul	Aug	Sep	Oct	Nov	Dec	Year
Mean daily maximum °C (°F)	4.9 (40.8)	4.9 (40.8)	5.2 (41.4)	7.0 (44.6)	9.0 (48.2)	11.5 (52.7)	13.2 (55.8)	13.2 (55.8)	11.1 (52.0)	8.0 (46.4)	5.9 (42.6)	4.9 (40.8)	8.2 (46.8)
Mean daily minimum °C (°F)	1.7 (35.1)	1.6 (34.9)	1.9 (35.4)	3.6 (38.5)	5.8 (42.4)	8.8 (47.8)	10.5 (50.9)	10.4 (50.7)	8.3 (46.9)	5.2 (41.4)	3.0 (37.4)	1.9 (35.4)	5.2 (41.4)
Average precipitation mm (inches)	200.0 (7.87)	191.0 (7.52)	183.0 (7.20)	183.0 (7.20)	115.0 (4.53)	93.0 (3.66)	113.0 (4.45)	140.0 (5.51)	196.0 (7.72)	184.0 (7.24)	186.0 (7.32)	207.0 (8.15)	1,991 (78.37)
Source: https://en.climate-data.org/europe/iceland/vestmannaeyjar/vestmannaeyjar-45471/

Climate data for Vestmannaeyjar, 1981–2010 normals, extremes 1949–2013
Month	Jan	Feb	Mar	Apr	May	Jun	Jul	Aug	Sep	Oct	Nov	Dec	Year
Record high °C (°F)	9.2 (48.6)	10.0 (50.0)	9.0 (48.2)	11.6 (52.9)	16.5 (61.7)	19.3 (66.7)	21.6 (70.9)	20.3 (68.5)	15.4 (59.7)	13.4 (56.1)	10.5 (50.9)	10.0 (50.0)	21.6 (70.9)
Mean daily maximum °C (°F)	3.8 (38.8)	3.8 (38.8)	3.9 (39.0)	5.6 (42.1)	8.4 (47.1)	10.5 (50.9)	12.3 (54.1)	12.1 (53.8)	9.8 (49.6)	6.8 (44.2)	5.0 (41.0)	4.1 (39.4)	7.2 (45.0)
Daily mean °C (°F)	1.8 (35.2)	1.7 (35.1)	1.8 (35.2)	3.5 (38.3)	6.1 (43.0)	8.4 (47.1)	10.1 (50.2)	10.2 (50.4)	8.0 (46.4)	5.1 (41.2)	3.2 (37.8)	2.1 (35.8)	5.2 (41.4)
Mean daily minimum °C (°F)	−0.3 (31.5)	−0.4 (31.3)	−0.2 (31.6)	1.7 (35.1)	4.4 (39.9)	6.9 (44.4)	8.6 (47.5)	8.7 (47.7)	6.5 (43.7)	3.5 (38.3)	1.3 (34.3)	0.2 (32.4)	3.4 (38.1)
Record low °C (°F)	−15.7 (3.7)	−16.3 (2.7)	−14.9 (5.2)	−16.9 (1.6)	−7.1 (19.2)	−1.4 (29.5)	3.7 (38.7)	2.6 (36.7)	−2.6 (27.3)	−7.5 (18.5)	−10.7 (12.7)	−15.3 (4.5)	−16.9 (1.6)
Average precipitation mm (inches)	159.4 (6.28)	141.9 (5.59)	137.1 (5.40)	112.6 (4.43)	94.1 (3.70)	83.6 (3.29)	103.4 (4.07)	137.9 (5.43)	153.6 (6.05)	154.8 (6.09)	153.7 (6.05)	165.7 (6.52)	1,597.9 (62.91)
Average precipitation days (≥ 1.0 mm)	19.3	18.1	17.6	15.3	13.5	11.5	13.4	15.3	17.1	16.7	16.5	18.5	192.0
Average snowy days (≥ 0 cm)	8.7	7.4	6.5	1.9	0.4	0.0	0.0	0.0	0.0	0.6	2.9	6.2	33.9
Average relative humidity (%)	78.8	79.6	78.5	80.1	82.4	87.2	88.3	87.4	84.4	82.8	79.8	78.7	82.3
Average dew point °C (°F)	−1.5 (29.3)	−1.7 (28.9)	−1.8 (28.8)	0.0 (32.0)	3.1 (37.6)	6.2 (43.2)	8.2 (46.8)	8.1 (46.6)	5.4 (41.7)	2.0 (35.6)	0.0 (32.0)	−1.3 (29.7)	2.2 (36.0)
Source 1: NOAA (humidity 1961-1990)
Source 2: Iceland Met Office (extremes)

Coastal temperature data for Vestmannaeyjar
Month	Jan	Feb	Mar	Apr	May	Jun	Jul	Aug	Sep	Oct	Nov	Dec	Year
Average sea temperature °C (°F)	6.3 (43.34)	6.5 (43.70)	6.3 (43.34)	6.7 (44.06)	8.0 (46.40)	9.3 (48.74)	11.1 (51.98)	11.6 (52.88)	11.0 (51.80)	8.7 (47.66)	7.6 (45.68)	6.9 (44.42)	8.3 (47.00)
Source 1: Seatemperature.net

== History and name ==
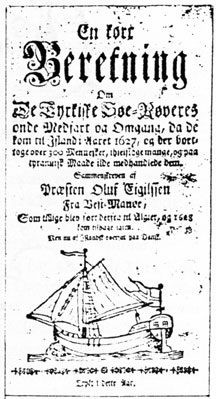
Title page of the book by Ólafur Egilsson, who was captured by Barbary corsairs in 1627

Map of the archipelago

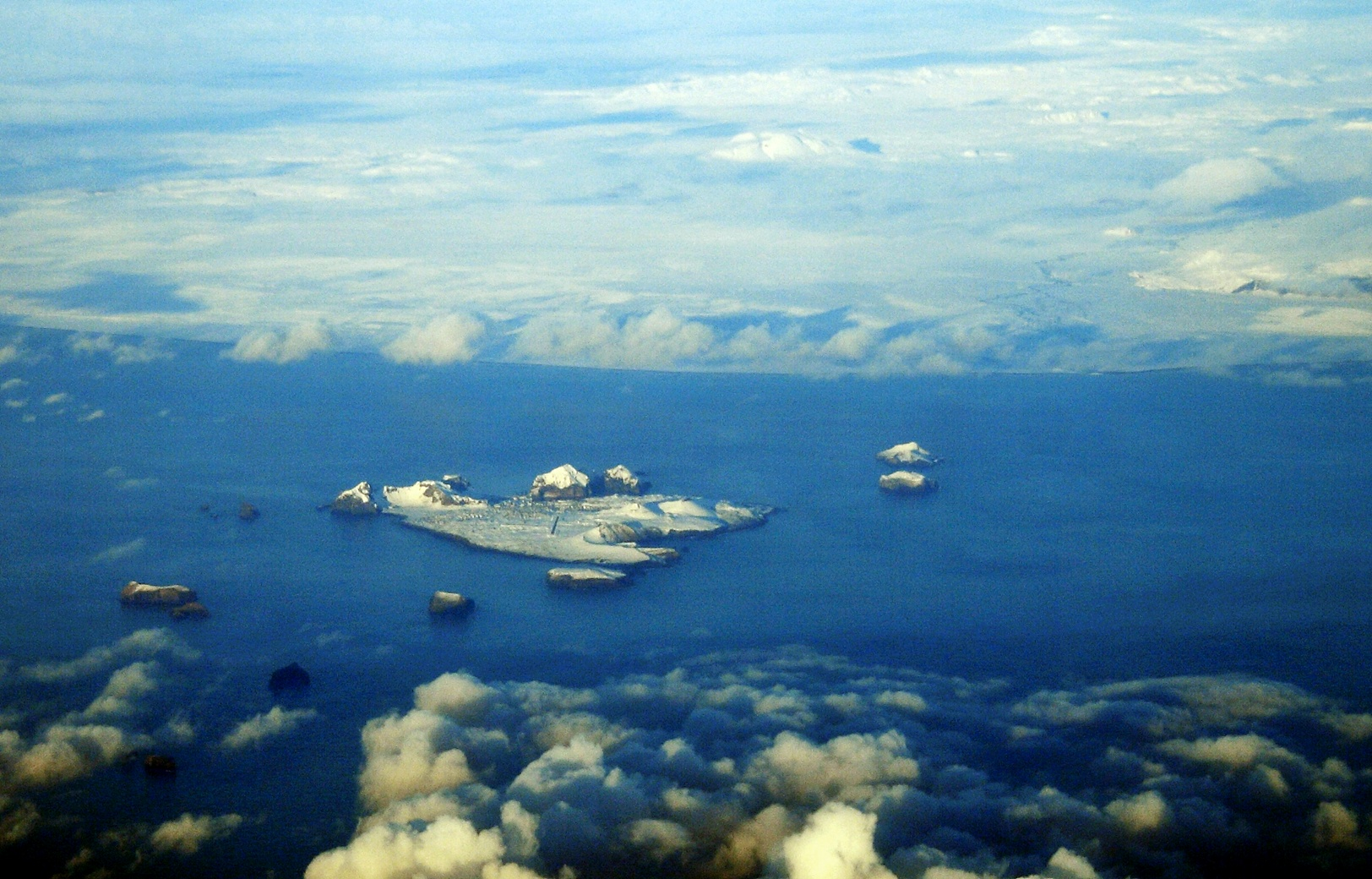
February 2009 south aerial view of Súlnasker Geldungur, Hellisey, Álsey, Brandur, Suðurey, Heimaey, Bjarnarey, Elliðaey, with the Icelandic mainland in the background

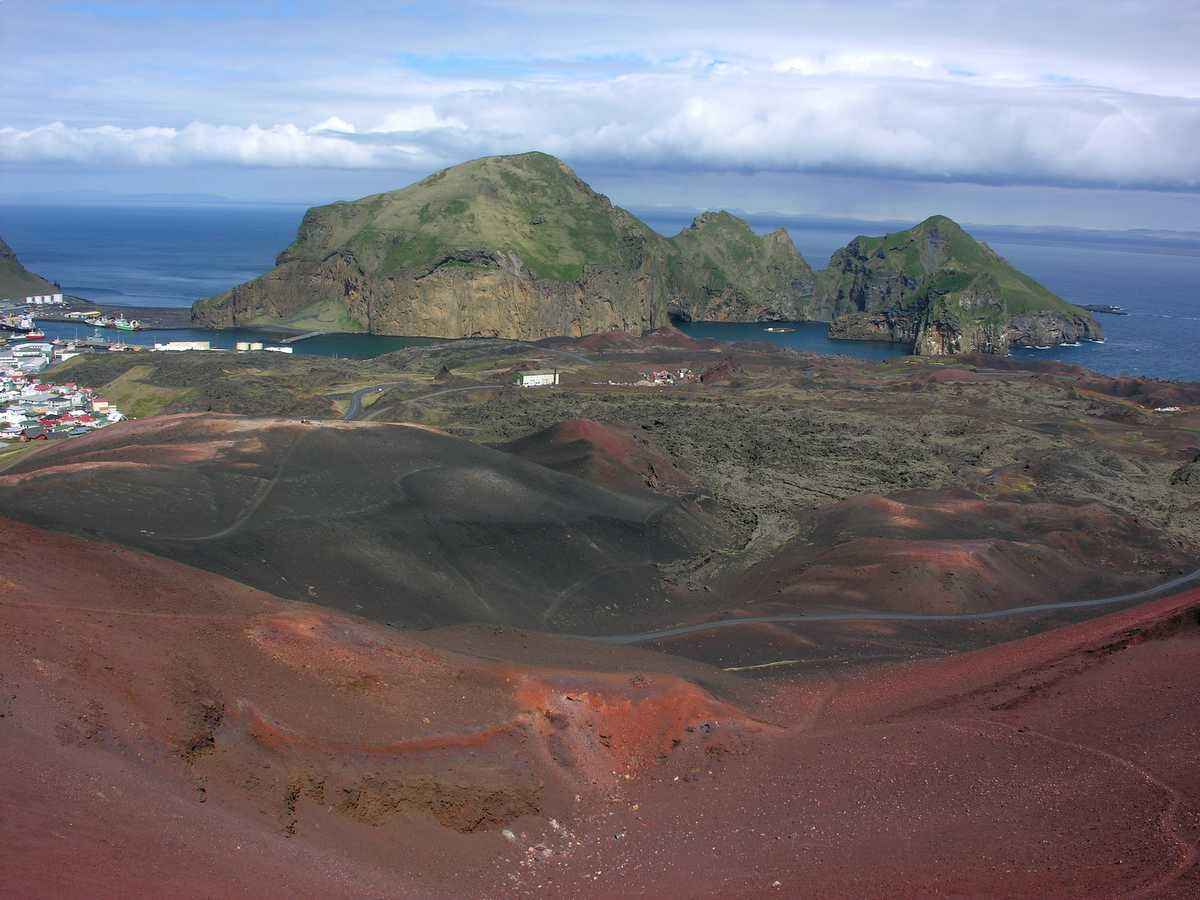
Heimaklettur seen from the top of Eldfell Volcano, which erupted on 23 January 1973

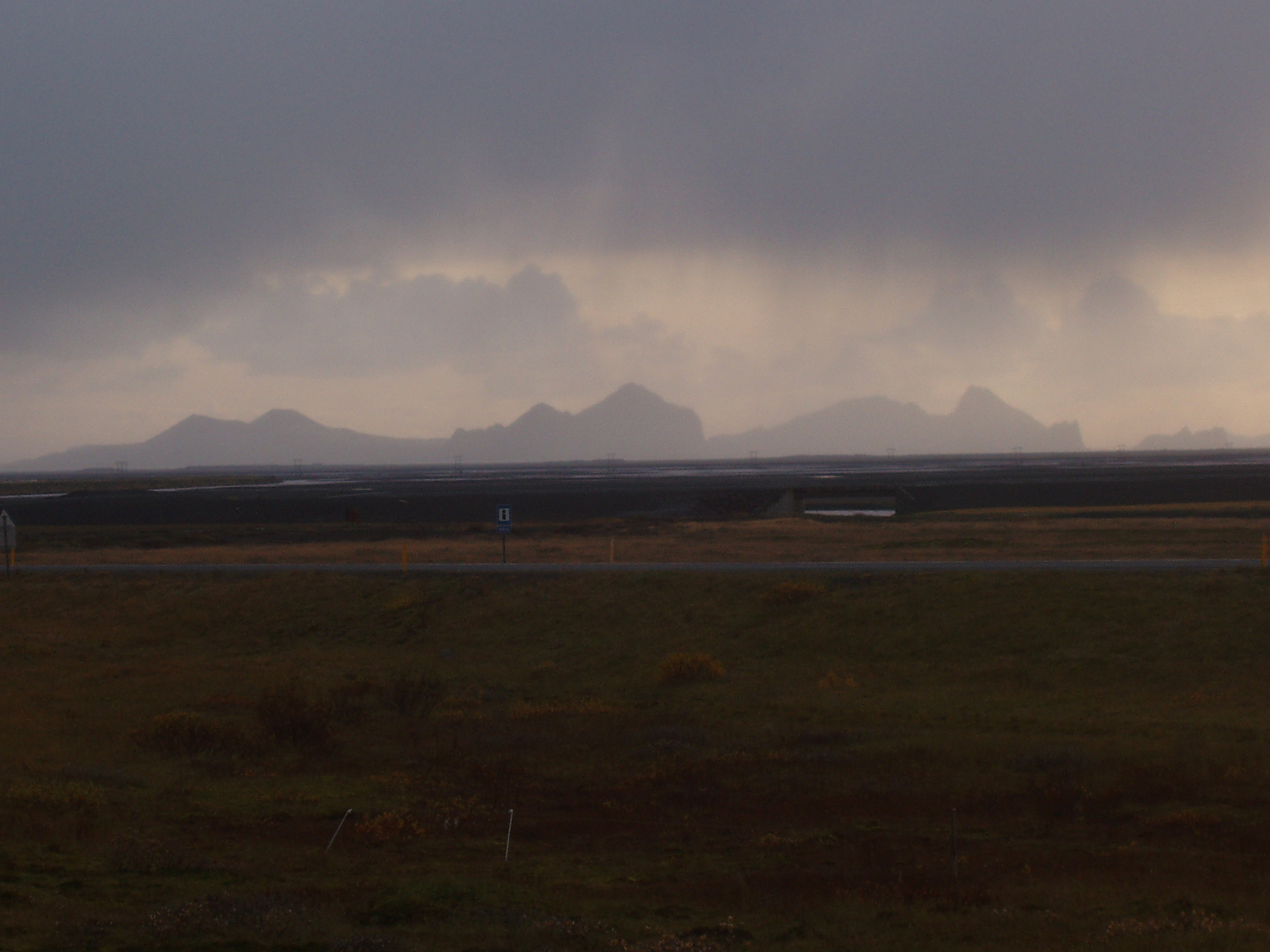
Vestmannaeyjar as seen from Route 1, mainland Iceland

Development of the coastline of Heimaey during the eruption of Eldfell in 1973

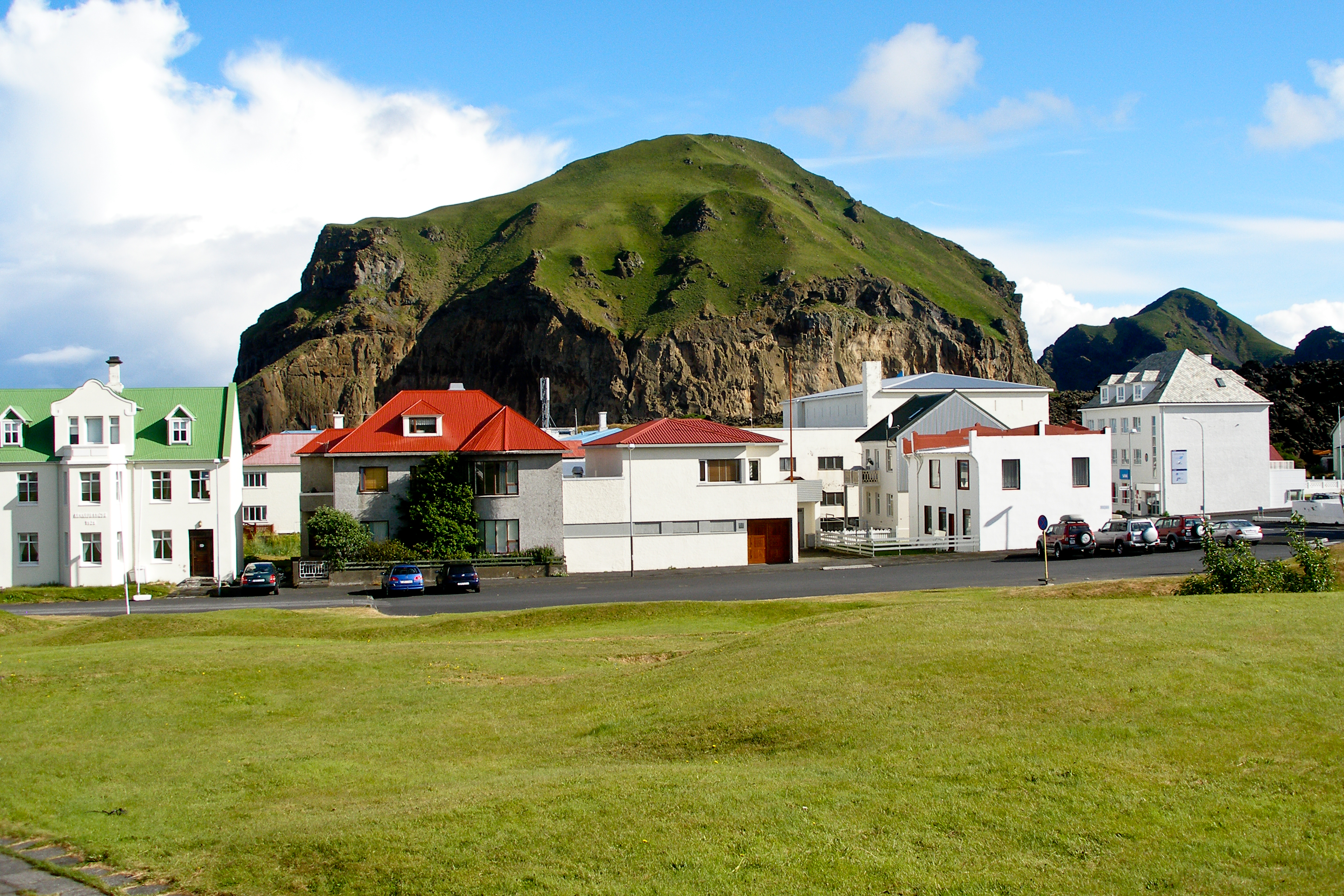
Heimaklettur seen from Stakkagerðistún, which is a public park in the middle of Heimaey

=== Early years ===
The islands are named after Gaels who had been captured into slavery by Norsemen. The Old Norse word Vestmenn, literally "Westmen", was applied to the Celts of Britain and Ireland, and retained in Icelandic even though Iceland is further west than Britain and Ireland. (In contrast, the Norse Gaels often called themselves Ostmen or Austmenn – "East-men".)

Not long after Ingólfr Arnarson arrived in Iceland, his blood brother Hjörleifr Hróðmarsson was murdered by the thralls he had brought with him. Ingólfur tracked them down to the Vestmannaeyjar and killed them all in retribution, hence the name Vestmannaeyjar (the islands of the west men). This is speculated to have occurred in c. 875.

=== Arab pirate ships raid ===
In 1627, three Arab pirate ships from the Ottoman Empire-controlled Barbary Coast, what is now Morocco and Algeria, raided several towns on the south coast of Iceland and outlying islands. They captured the islands on 16 July 1627, in an event known as the Turkish Abductions, and stayed there until 19 July 1627. They had earlier raided the east of Iceland, and Murat Reis from Salé in Morocco had commanded another raid in Grindavík in June of that year.

The Arab pirates killed or kidnapped--and sent to Algeria as slaves and concubines--almost half of the people of Heimaey. They burned down the island's church, killed one of its pastors, and kidnapped the other pastor. The pirates captured and kidnapped 234 people from the islands and took them on a 27-day voyage to Algiers, where most of them spent the rest of their lives in bondage. One of the captives, Lutheran minister Ólafur Egilsson, managed to return in 1628 and wrote a book about his experience, but his wife Ásta Þorsteinsdóttir did not return until 1637 and his sons never returned.

In 1636, ransom was paid for 34 of the captives, and most of them returned to Iceland. After this, a small fort was built on Skansinn (that is, "the bastion"), and an armed guard was established to keep watch from the mountain Helgafell for the approach of ships.

=== 1700-present ===
For centuries, the people of the Vestmannaeyjar had a struggle for existence, living from fishing and wild birds and their eggs, which they gathered in the cliffs and rock stacks offshore. At the end of the 19th century, when the population was about 600, changes took place in the lifestyle of the islanders. In 1904, the first motorised boat was purchased, and more followed afterwards. By 1930, the population had risen to 3,470. Shortage of fresh water was also a problem for a long time, but improvement took place in 1968 when a pipeline was laid.

The area is volcanically active, like the rest of Iceland. There were two major eruptions in the 20th century: the eruption in 1963 that created the new island of Surtsey, and the Eldfell eruption of January 1973, which created a 200-metre-high (660 ft) mountain where a meadow had been, and caused the island's 5,000 inhabitants to be temporarily evacuated to the mainland.

In 2000, Heimaey stave church, a replica of the Haltdalen Stave Church containing a replica of the St Olav frontal, was erected at Skansinn as a gift from the Norwegian government to Iceland, commemorating the conversion of Iceland to Christianity a thousand years before.

== Transportation ==
A ferry service runs from Landeyjahöfn (closer) and sometimes under bad conditions to Þorlákshöfn (further away). The new Landeyjahöfn harbour opened in 2010, shortening the sailing time to around 40 minutes. A new hybrid electric ferry with a 3 MWh (11 GJ) battery and capacity for 550 passengers and 75 cars started operating the 13-kilometre (8.1-mile) route in July 2019. It uses 100 MWh (360 GJ) week, replacing 35 tonnes (35,000 kg; 39 short tons) of fuel. In bad weather, the longer route to Þorlákshöfn requires fuel.

Vestmannaeyjar Airport services seasonal, charter and medical flights as well as general aviation. Seasonal scheduled flights to Reykjavík are provided during the winter months by Norlandair. Vestmannaeyjagöng is a proposed undersea tunnel to the mainland.

== Popular culture ==
=== Festival ===
The islands are famed in Iceland for their major annual festival, Þjóðhátíð ("The National Festival"), which attracts thousands of people. The festival was first held in 1874, at the same time as the commemoration of the millennium of the settlement of Iceland. Vestmannaeyjar residents had been prevented by bad weather from sailing to the mainland for the festivities and thus celebrated locally.

=== Film ===
- From 1998 to 2003, the island of Heimaey was home to Keiko the killer whale, star of Free Willy (1993).
- The film The Deep (2012), based on true events, is set on and around the island.

=== Literature ===
- The islands and their history of volcanic activity play a major role in James Rollins' seventh Sigma Force novel, The Devil Colony (2011).
- The islands feature as the primary location in Yrsa Sigurðardóttir's novel Ashes to Dust, which uses the 1973 eruption of Eldfell as a key element in the plot.

=== Sport ===
ÍBV, based on Vestmannaeyjar have won national championships and national cups in both handball and football.

The Westman Islands Golf Club was established in 1938 and is located in the remnants of an extinct volcano. Golf Monthly ranks it as one of the top 200 golf courses in Europe.

== Notable people ==
- Ásgeir Sigurvinsson (born 1955), retired footballer, was born in Vestmannaeyjar and started his career at ÍBV
- Bergur Elías Ágústsson (born 1963), former mayor of Norðurþing, was born in Vestmannaeyjar
- Elísa Viðarsdóttir (born 1991) was born in Vestmannaeyjar and started her career at ÍBV
- Elsa Guðbjörg Vilmundardóttir (1932–2008), Iceland's first female geologist, was born in Vestmannaeyjar
- Fanndís Friðriksdóttir (born 1990), footballer from Vestmannaeyjar, training at ÍBV's youth programme
- Gísli Pálsson (born 1949), professor of anthropology, was born in Vestmannaeyjar
- Guðmundur Guðmundsson (1825–83), one of the first Mormon missionaries to preach in Iceland, preached in Vestmannaeyjar
- Guðmundur Torfason (born 1961), retired footballer, was born in Vestmannaeyjar
- Gunnar Heiðar Þorvaldsson (born 1982), footballer, was born in Vestmannaeyjar and has been signed to ÍBV on 3 occasions
- Halldóra Briem (1913–1993), the first Icelandic woman to study architecture, was born in Vestmannaeyjar
- Heimir Hallgrímsson (born 1967), manager of the Republic of Ireland national football team, was born in Vestmannaeyjar and has both played for and managed ÍBV teams on more than one occasions; he is still the dentist for the town
- Helgi Ólafsson (born 1956), chess grandmaster, is a native of Heimaey
- Hermann Hreiðarsson (born 1974), footballer, has been both player and player-manager at ÍBV
- Hlynur Andrésson (born 1993), distance runner and national record holder in the marathon distance, was born and raised in Vestmannaeyjar
- Högna Sigurðardóttir (1929–2017), architect, was born in Vestmannaeyjar
- Ívar Ingimarsson (born 1977), footballer and cousin of Gunnar Heiðar Þorvaldsson, played for ÍBV in 1998–1999
- Júlíana Sveinsdóttir (1889–1966), painter and textile artist, was born in Vestmannaeyjar
- Kári Kristjánsson (born 1984), handball player, was born in Vestmannaeyjar
- Kolfinna Kristófersdóttir, a model, is originally from Vestmannaeyjar
- Marcellus de Niveriis OFM (died 1460 or 1462), bishop of Skálholt was master of the manor of Vestmannaeyjar
- Margrét Lára Viðarsdóttir (born 1986) is a retired footballer and is considered by many to be the best Icelandic female footballer of all time. Played for ÍBV, Valur and also played in Sweden and Germany. Scored 79 goals in 124 games for Iceland. Voted Icelandic athlete of the year 2007.
- Ólafur Egilsson (1564–1639), a Lutheran minister who, in 1627, with his wife and sons, was kidnapped in the Turkish Abduction, subsequently writing a memoir of his travels
- Sigurvin Ólafsson (born 1976), footballer, was born in Vestmannaeyjar and has twice been signed to ÍBV
- Smári McCarthy (born 1984), information activist and Icelandic Pirate Party MP, grew up in Vestmannaeyjar, his family having moved there when he was 9
- Sólveig Anspach (1960–2015), film director and screenwriter, was born in Vestmannaeyjar
- Tryggvi Guðmundsson (born 1974), footballer, was born in Vestmannaeyjar and started his career at ÍBV, returning there twice
- Þórarinn Ingi Valdimarsson (born 1990), footballer, was born in Vestmannaeyjar and started his career at ÍBV
- Þorsteinn Ingi Sigfússon (1954–2019), award-winning physicist, was born in Vestmannaeyjar

== See also ==
- Geography of Iceland
- Iceland plume
- List of glaciers of Iceland
- List of lakes of Iceland
- List of islands of Iceland
- List of volcanoes in Iceland
- List of rivers of Iceland
- List of waterfalls of Iceland
- Volcanism of Iceland
- Framhaldsskólinn í Vestmannaeyjum
