= Elliðaey =

Island south of Iceland

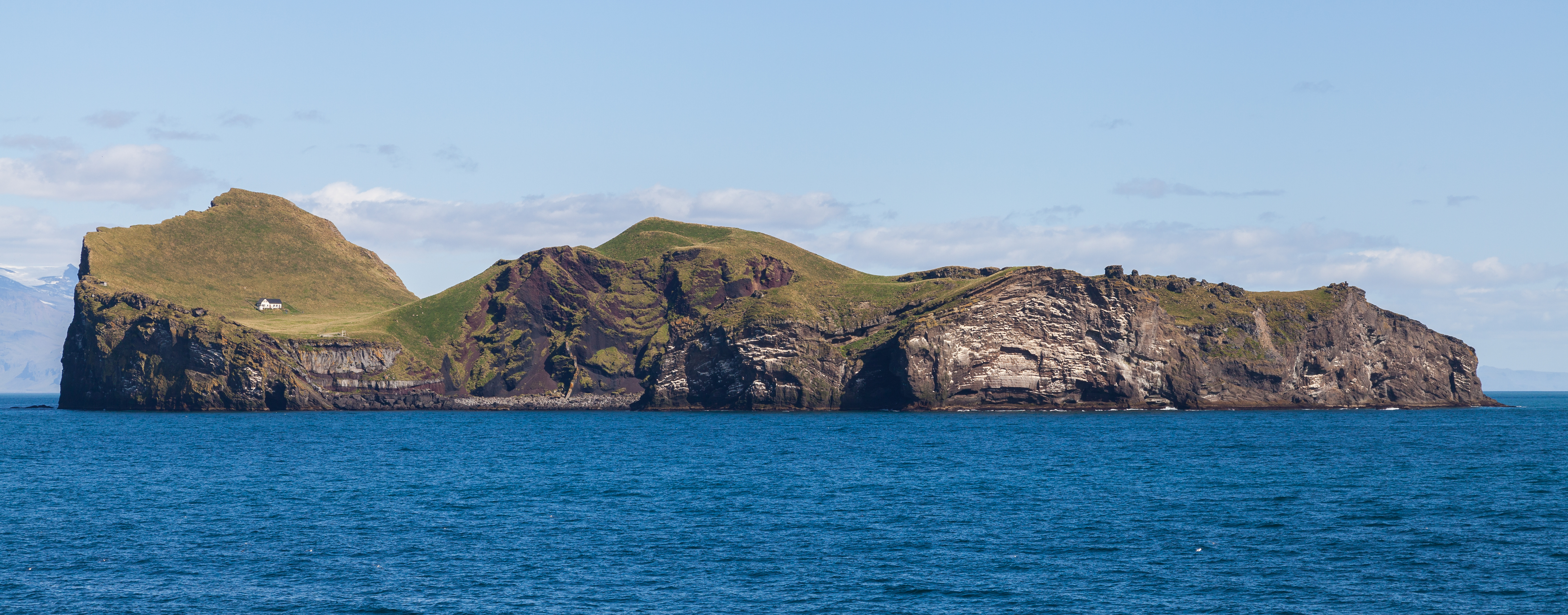

Geography
- Location: South of Iceland
- Coordinates: 63°27′55″N 20°10′30″W
- Archipelago: Vestmannaeyjar
- Area: 0.45 km^{2} (0.17 sq mi)

Administration
- Iceland

Demographics
- Population: 0

Elliðaey (Icelandic pronunciation: [ˈɛtlɪːðaˌeiː]; or Ellirey [ˈɛtlɪrˌeiː]) is a small, uninhabited island south of Iceland. It is the most northeastern of the Vestmannaeyjar (Westman Islands), an archipelago consisting of 15 to 18 islands and assorted smaller rocks.

== Geography ==
The island has a size of 0.45 km^{2} (110 acres; 45 hectares), making it the third-largest island in the archipelago. It has no permanent population and is not home to much wildlife except for an abundance of puffins. It is about 7 miles (11 km) from the south coast of the mainland of Iceland.

The larger of the two buildings on the island is a hunting lodge, built in 1953 by the Elliðaey Hunting Association. There also exists an old storage hut and workshop built into the hill across from the lodge, which may have been used by biologists to store equipment. The lodge is often referred to as the "world's loneliest house" on social media.

Despite a widespread misconception among foreign fans, the Icelandic singer and artist Björk does not live on the island. The misconception comes from a speech by the Icelandic prime minister, who in 2000 said he would be willing to allow Björk to live for free on an island in Breiðafjörður which is also named Elliðaey. The artist, however, never purchased that island or bought a house there, and has no connection to the identically named Elliðaey in Vestmannaeyjar.

== In popular culture ==
It is the setting of a murder mystery "The Island" (Icelandic: "Drungi") by Icelandic author Ragnar Jónasson. In a preface, the author acknowledges the guides who gave him a tour of the island, and provided information about the island which feature in the story.
