= Herbert H. Ágústsson =

Austrian-Icelandic composer and hornist

Herbert Hriberschek Ágústsson (8 August 1926 – 20 June 2017, known as Herbert August Maria Hriberschek before becoming an Icelandic citizen) was an Austrian-Icelandic composer and hornist.

Herbert Hriberschek was born in Austria in August 1926. After completing his studies in 1944 in Graz with Franz Mixa and Arthur Michl, he played first horn for the Graz Philharmonic Orchestra for seven years. In 1953, he moved to Iceland, where he became principal hornist in the Iceland Symphony Orchestra.

His best known works include the Conc. Breve, op. 19 (1970) and Athvarf (1974). For his own instrument, he composed the Concerto for Horn and Orchestra (1963). He died in June 2017 at the age of 90 at Ísafold, a nursing home in Garðabær.
