= Melrakkaey =

Icelandic island

- Location in Iceland

Geography
- Location: Breiðafjörður Bay
- Coordinates: 64.984886°N 23.302746°W
- Area: 0.73 km^{2} (0.28 sq mi)

Administration
- Iceland
- Constituency: Northwest
- Region: Western Region
- Municipality: Grundarfjörður

Melrakkaey (Icelandic pronunciation: [ˈmɛlˌrahkaˌeiː]; lit. Fox Island) is a small, uninhabited island located in the Grundarfjörður municipality in Western Iceland.
The island has been declared a protected area. Consequently, entering the island without permission from the Nature Conservation Agency is prohibited, and shooting within a 2 km radius of the island is banned to protect its birdlife. Melrakkaey also lies within the Breiðafjörður conservation area, which is protected under a separate law, Act No. 54/1995.

== History ==
Throughout its history, Melrakkaey has been used as a source of food by locals. The ocean surrounding the island provided fish and fishing outposts were built on the island, many bird species call the basalt cliffs of Melrakkaey home, providing a stable source of meat and eggs. Furthermore, the Island was used as a larder by locals.

Melrakkaey was a possession of the Setberg since the 14th century. Setberg came into the ownership of Melrakkaey when a local elderly woman lost her two sons at sea and pledged the island to the church.
The reverends of Setberg used the island to farm hay every summer and a house was built on the island to accommodate workers.
Due to the island being a possession of Setberg, Danish sailors called the island "The Reverend’s Island".

In 1971, Malrakkaey became a protected area to protect the bird population on the island.

== Sources ==
- "MELRAKKAEY". nat.is. Retrieved July 28, 2020.
- "Melrakkaey". ust.is (in Icelandic). Retrieved July 28, 2020.
- "Information about Melrakkaey". guidetoiceland.is. Retrieved July 28, 2020.
