= Geirfuglasker (Vestmannaeyjar) =

Island in southwestern Iceland

Native name: Geirfuglasker
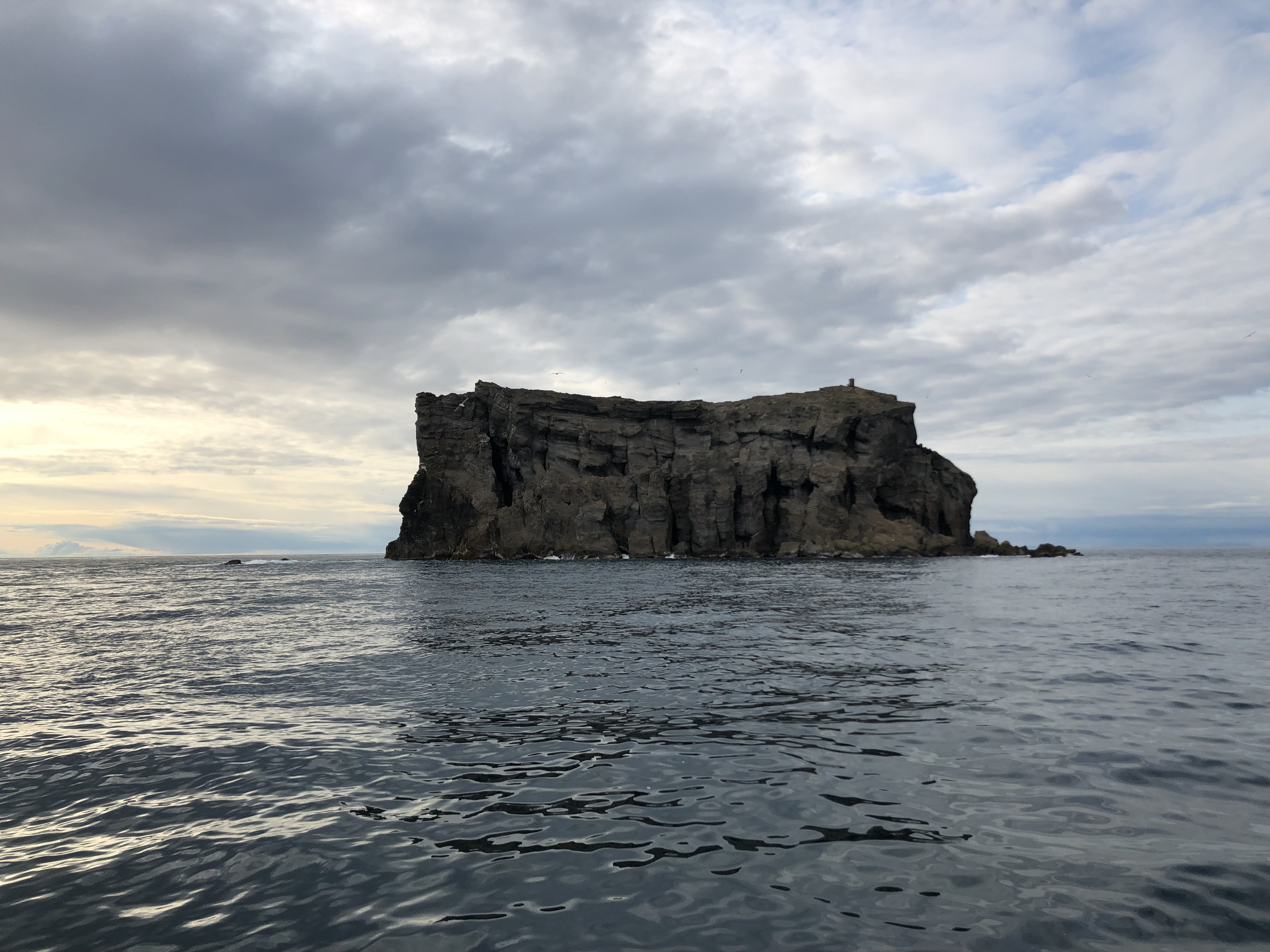

- Location within Iceland
- Other names: Geirfugladrangur; Freykja

Geography
- Location: Atlantic Ocean
- Coordinates: 63.32°N 20.50°W
- Archipelago: Vestmannaeyjar
- Area: 19,034.84 m^{2} (204,889.3 sq ft)
- Coastline: 574.75 m (1885.66 ft)

Administration
- Iceland
- Constituency: Suðurkjördæmi
- Region: Suðurland
- Municipality: Vestmannaeyjar
- Capital and largest city: Reykjavík (pop. 123 246)
- President: Guðni Th. Jóhannesson

Demographics
- Population: 0
- Pop. density: 0/km^{2} (0/sq mi)

Additional information
- Time zone: WET (UTC+0)

Geirfuglasker (Icelandic pronunciation: [ˈceirˌfʏklaˌscɛːr̥], lit. 'Great Auk Skerry'), also known as Geirfugladrangur (lit. 'Great Auk Stack'), or Freykja ([ˈfreiːca]), is a small, uninhabited island in the Vestmannaeyjar archipelago.

Geirfuglasker is located approximately 30 kilometres (19 mi) off Iceland's southwestern coast. The island hosted one of the last known colony of great auks, which thrived given its inaccessibility to humans. A volcanic eruption in 1830 forced the birds to move to Eldey, where the last pair was killed in 1844.
