= Halldóra Briem =

Icelandic architect

Halldóra Briem (13 February 1913, Vestmannaeyjar – 21 October 1993, Stockholm) was the first Icelandic woman to study architecture. She studied architecture at the KTH Royal Institute of Technology in Stockholm, Sweden from 1935 to 1940. She would go on to work professionally in Sweden.

In 1937, the Icelandic telephone company purchased an automatic clock machine from L.M. Ericsson that would tell the caller the time. Halldóra was asked to be the voice of the machine since she was living in Sweden at the time. This recording was used until 1963.
