= Brandur =

Island in Iceland

Coordinates: 63°23′26.11″N 20°21′54.30″W

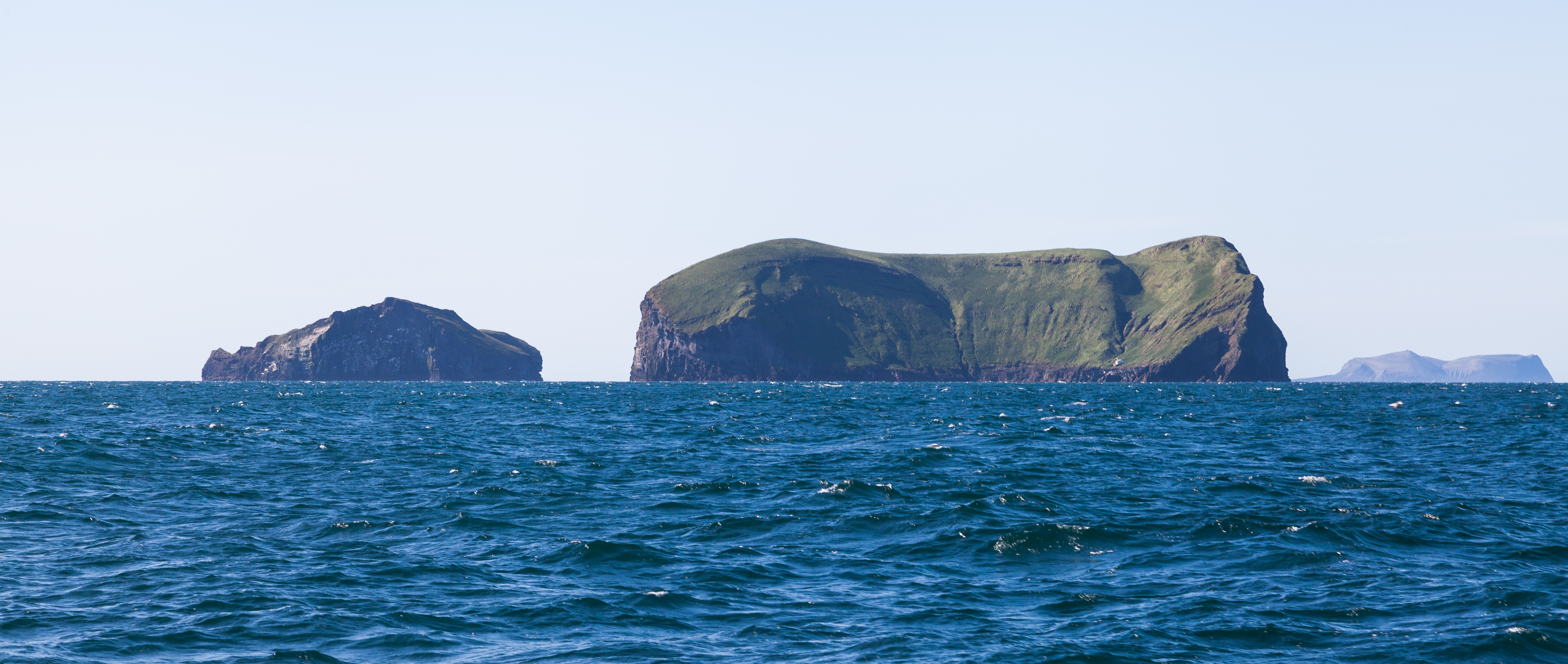
Brandur, Álsey and Surtsey islands.

Brandur (Icelandic pronunciation: [ˈprantʏr̥]) is a small, uninhabited island in the Vestmann Islands, south of Iceland.
