= Álsey =

Island in Iceland

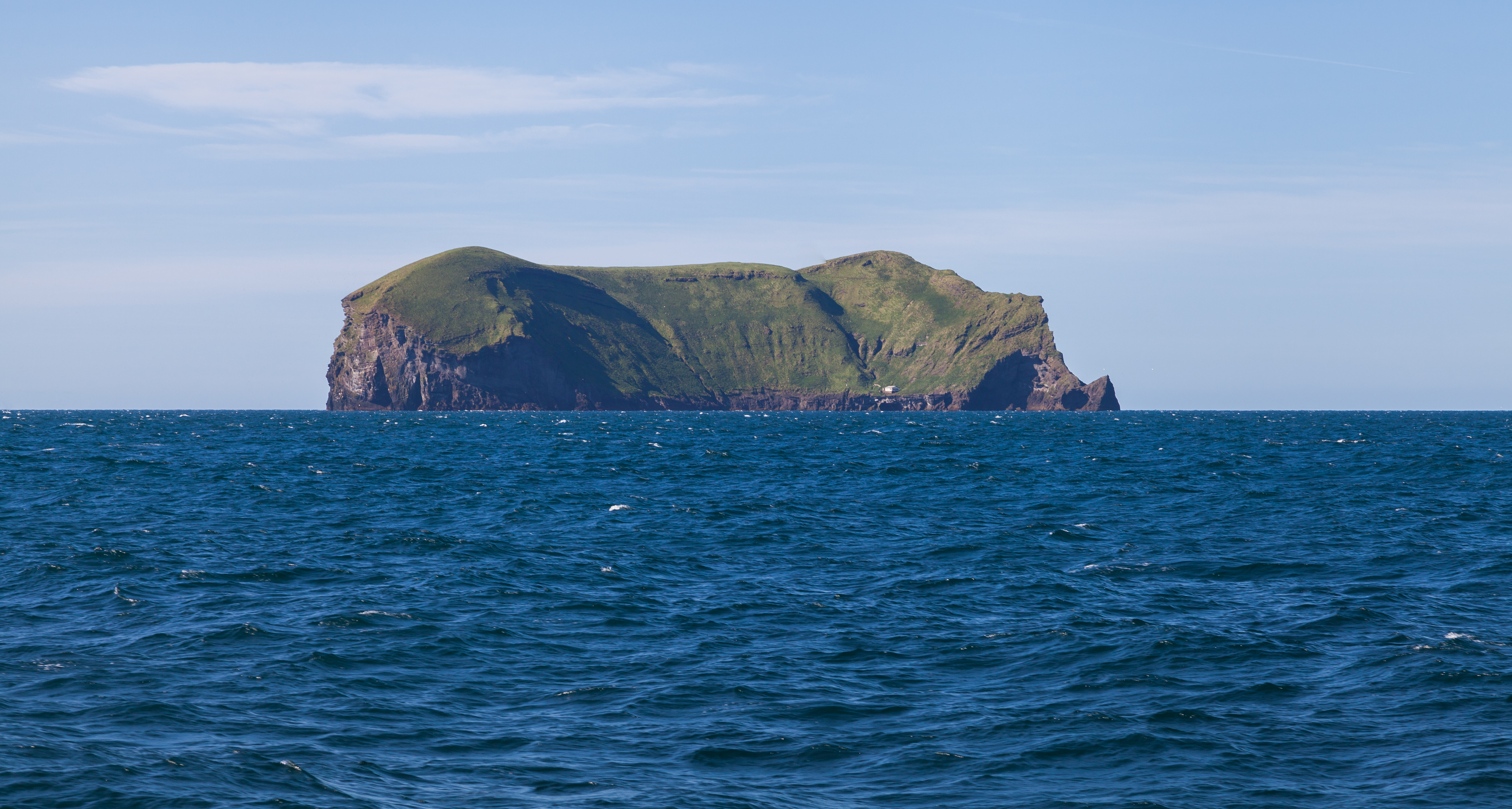
- Álsey

Geography
- Location: Atlantic Ocean
- Coordinates: 63°23′50.2″N 20°22′6.48″W
- Archipelago: Vestmannaeyjar
- Total islands: 15
- Area: 0.25 km^{2} (0.097 sq mi)

Administration
- Iceland

Álsey (Icelandic pronunciation: [ˈaulsˌeiː]) or Álfsey [ˈaul(f)sˌeiː] is a small, uninhabited island in the Vestmann Islands, south of Iceland.
