= Hellisey =

Island in the Vestmann Islands

Coordinates: 63°21′39.25″N 20°22′1.06″W

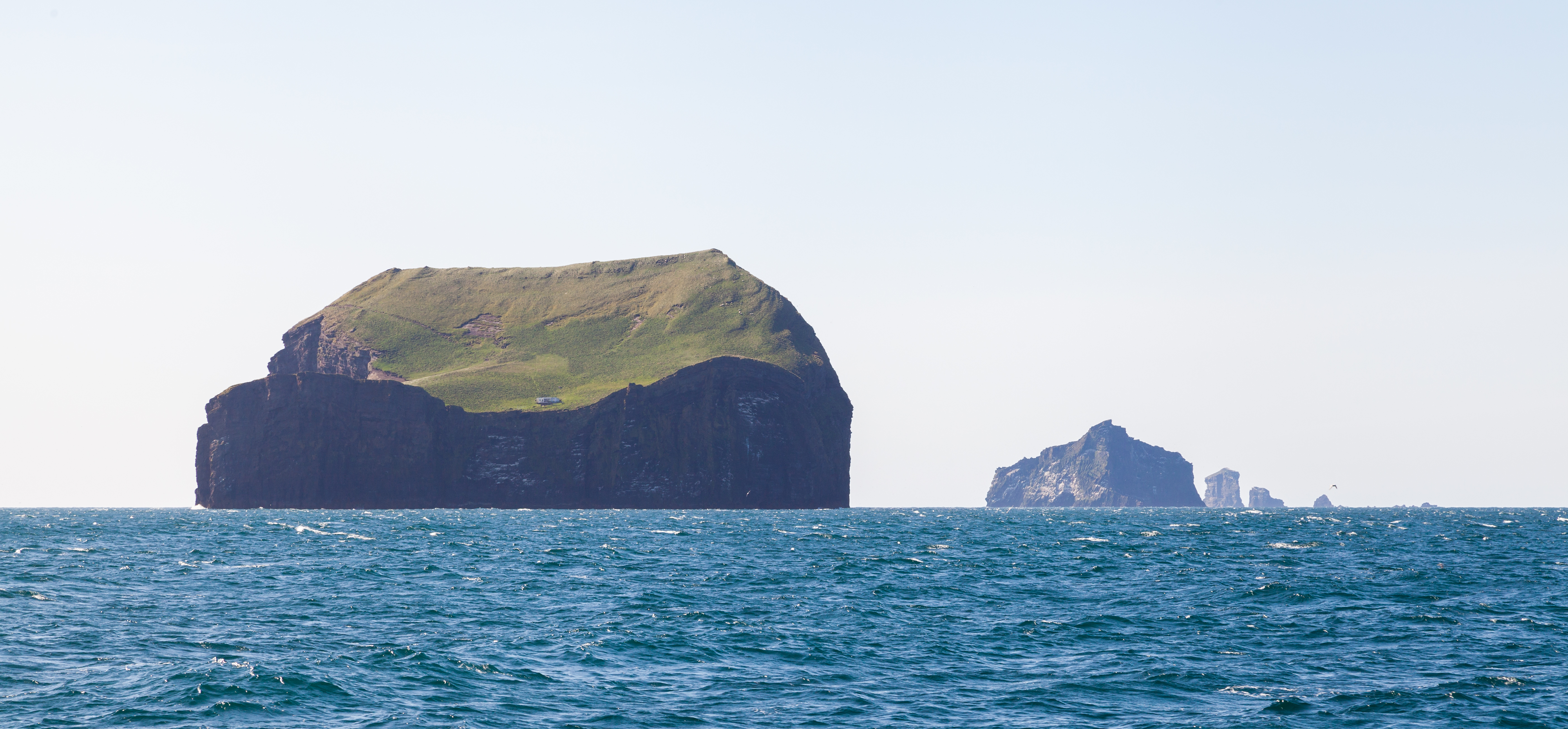
Suðurey, Hellisey, Súlnasker and Geldungur islands.

Hellisey (Icelandic pronunciation: [ˈhɛtlɪsˌeiː]) is a small, uninhabited island in the Vestmann Islands, south of Iceland. It is 6 km southwest of Heimaey and 13 km northeast of Surtsey. Hellisey only has an area of 0.1 km ² and extends to about 100 m above sea level.

== Nature ==
The island is a bird paradise. Like other Vestmann Islands, Hellisey is also a volcanic island. A local company makes fishing tours to the island. Prior to 1960, the island also had some sheep.

== Miscellaneous ==
A fishing boat was named after the island. It sank on 12 March 1984. Guðlaugur Friðþórsson was the only survivor of the crew.

As with other Vestmann islands, Hellysey has inspired some traditional poems
