= Súlnasker =

Island in Iceland

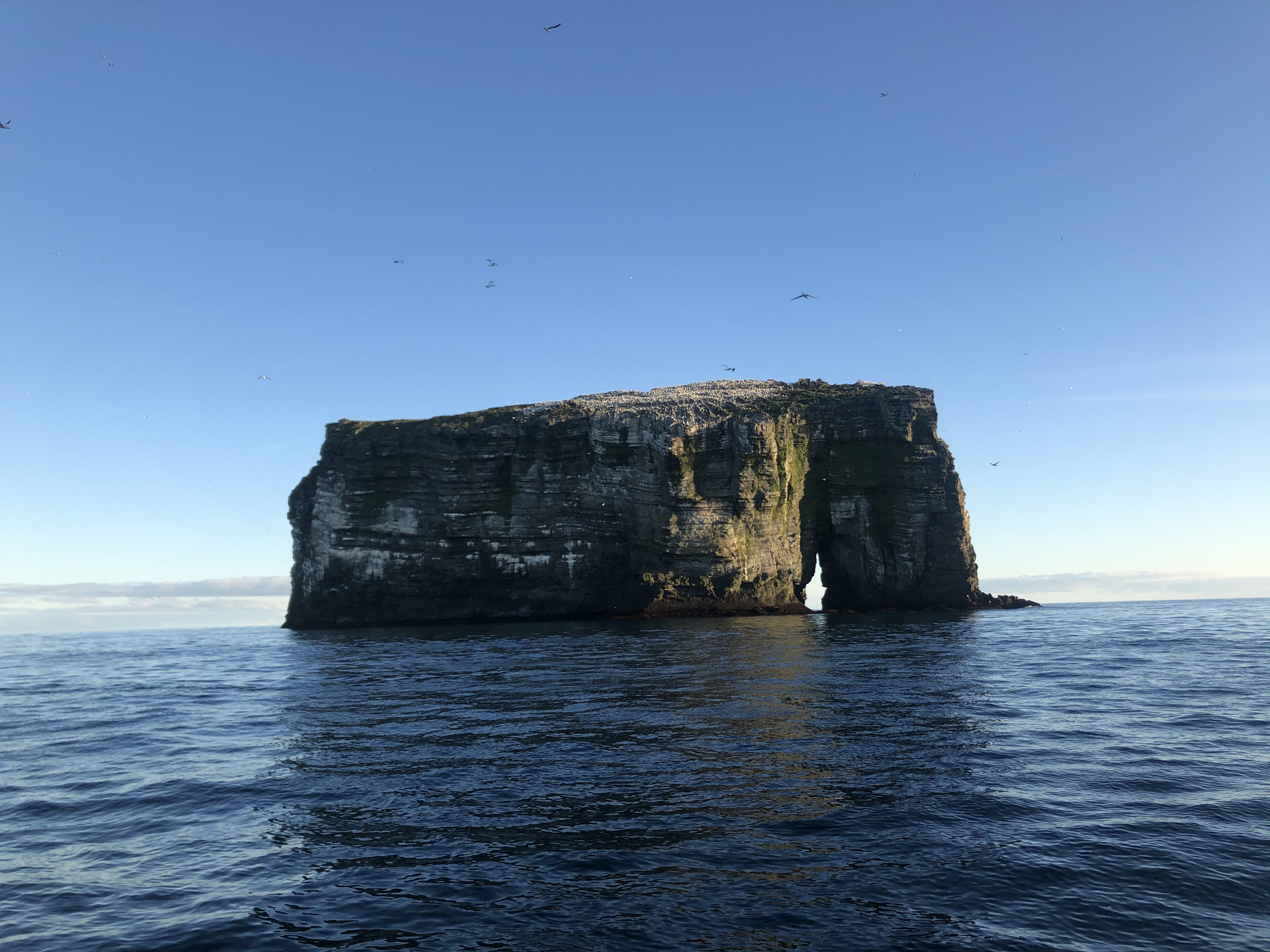

- Location within Iceland

Geography
- Location: Atlantic ocean
- Coordinates: 63°19′51″N 20°23′56″W
- Archipelago: Vestmannaeyjar
- Area: 34,688.98 m^{2} (373,389.1 sq ft)
- Coastline: 999.65 m (3279.69 ft)

Administration
- Iceland

Demographics
- Population: 0
- Pop. density: 0/km^{2} (0/sq mi)
- Languages: Icelandic
- Ethnic groups: Icelanders

Additional information
- Time zone: WET (UTC+0)

Súlnasker (Icelandic pronunciation: [ˈsulnaˌscɛːr̥]) is a small, uninhabited island in the Vestmann Islands, south of Iceland. It is noted by the Natural Science Institute of Iceland as an important breeding site for birds.
