= Suðurey =

Island in Iceland

Coordinates: 63°23′18.07″N 20°19′12.93″W

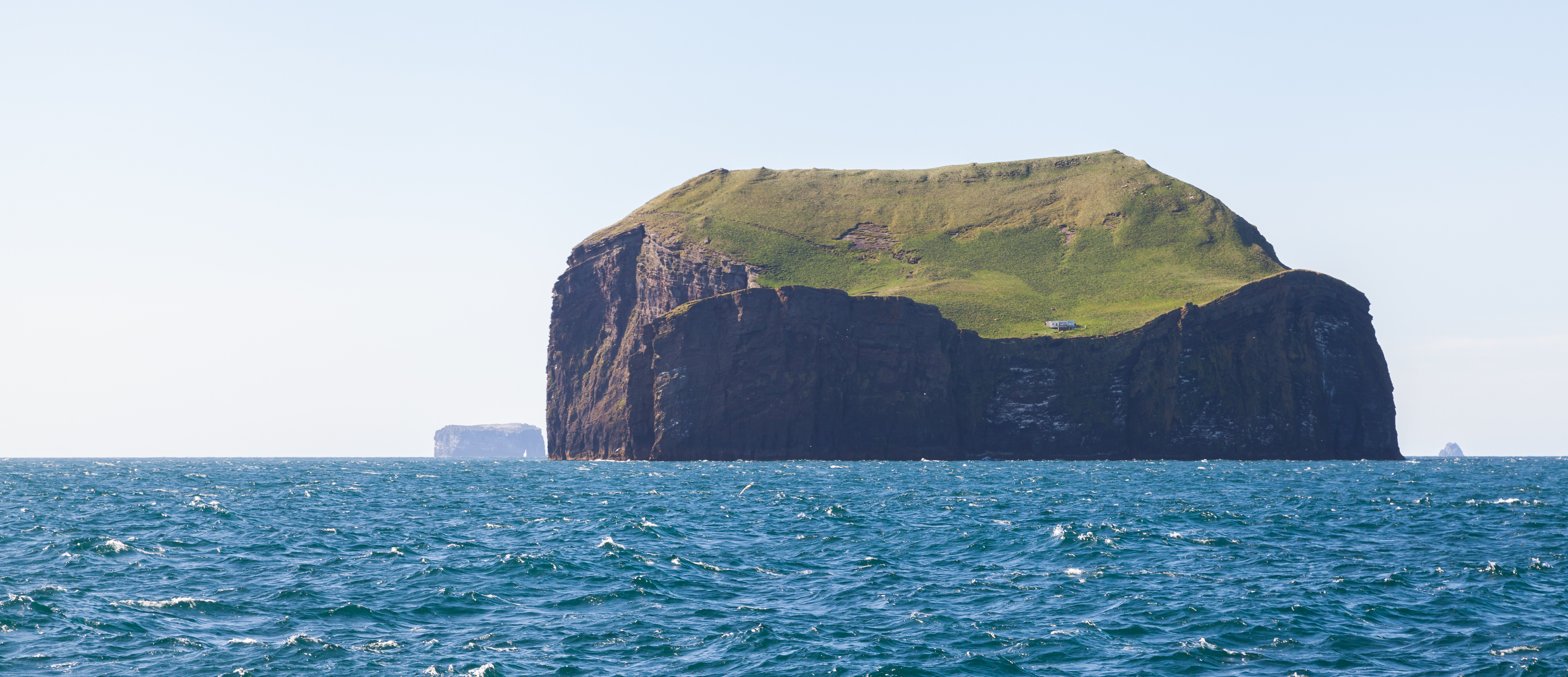
Suðurey

Suðurey (Icelandic pronunciation: [ˈsʏːðʏrˌeiː]) is a small, uninhabited island in the Vestmann Islands, south of Iceland.
