= Reykjanes (disambiguation) =

Reykjanes is the south-west end of the Reykjanes Peninsula of Iceland.

It is a common geographical name in Iceland and the other officially recognised geographical places with their municipality are given at the bottom of this page.

Reykjanes may also refer to or qualify:

- Reykjanes Peninsula (Reykjanesskagia) region in south-west Iceland.
- Southern Peninsula administrative area in Reykjanesskagia, south-west Iceland .
- Reykjanes UNESCO Global Geopark as in List of UNESCO Global Geoparks in Europe.
- Reykjanes Ridge part of the Mid-Atlantic Ridge to the south of Iceland.

In geology:

- Reykjanes volcanic belt or Reykjanes volcanic zone grouping all the volcanic systems in the Reykjanes Peninsula .
- Reykjanes volcanic system in the Reykjanes volcanic belt.
- Reykjanes Fires refers to a series of eruptions between approximately 1210 and 1240.
- See Reykjanes Fires#New Reykjanes Fires for the term New Reykjanes Fires grouping eruptions from 2021.

Other uses:

- For the steamship, see SS Reykjanes.
- For the Reykjanes power station situated in Reykjanes, while other power stations exist on the Reykjanes Peninsula.

Other geographical places in Iceland with the Icelandic municipality in brackets:

- Reykjanes (Súðavíkurhreppur) near Súðavík in Westfjords being a peninsula on the east side of Reykjarfjörður
- Reykjanes (Árneshreppur) in Westfjords at the western entrance to Húnaflói bay.
- Reykjanes (Kaldrananeshreppur) in Westfjords on the coast west of Drangsnes.
- Reykjanes (Reykhólahreppur) on the west coast of Westfjords
- Reykjanes (Borgarbyggð) in the west of Iceland
- Reykjanes (Skeiða- og Gnúpverjahreppur) about 10 km (6.2 mi) south east of Flúðir in south-central Iceland.
- Reykjanes (Bláskógabyggð) on the west bank of Brúará river north-east of Apavatn in south-east Iceland
