= Reykjanesbær =

- Municipality
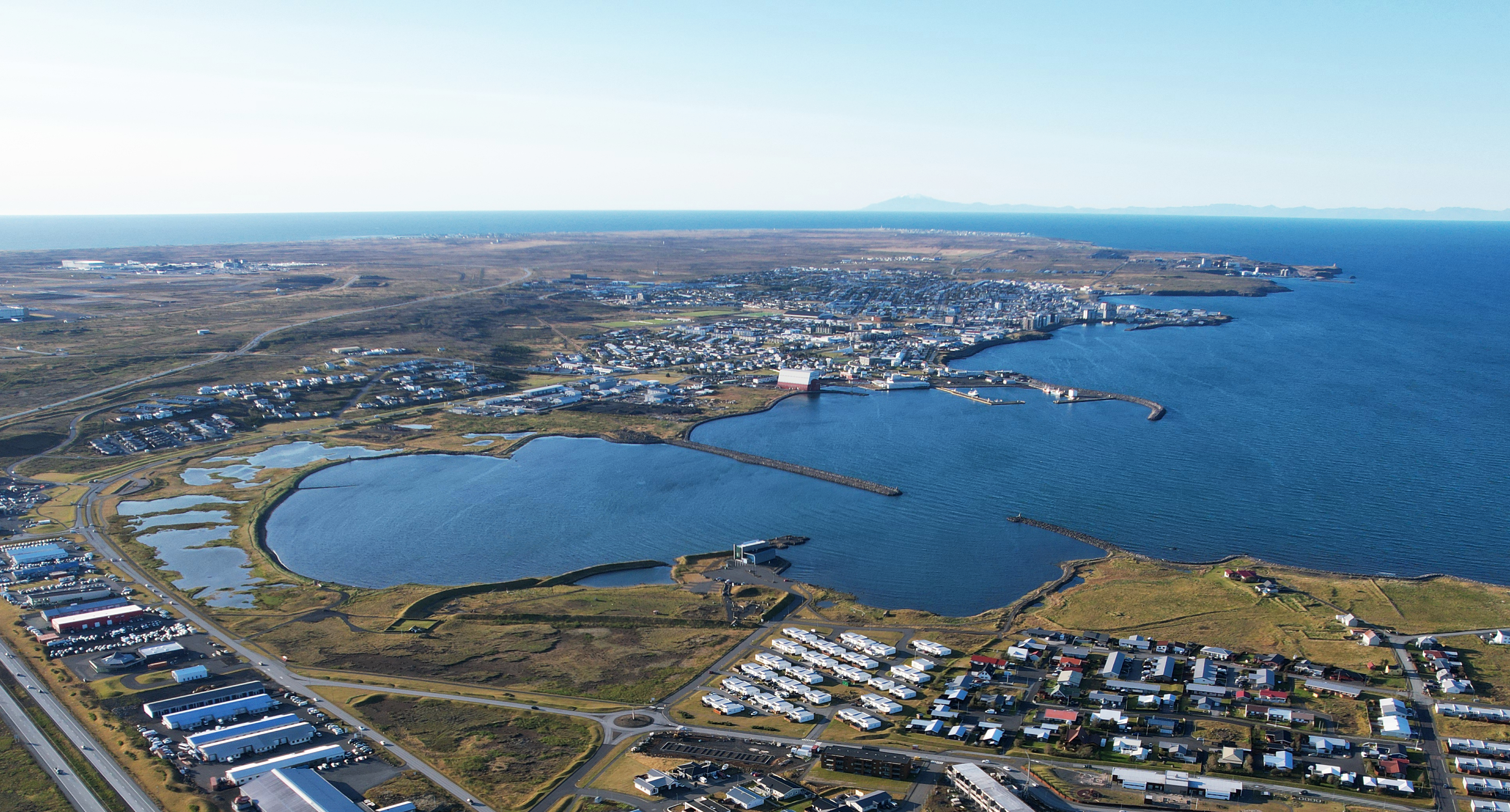
- Aerial view of Reykjanesbær

- Country: Iceland
- Region: Southern Peninsula
- Constituency: South Constituency

Government
  - Mayor: Kjartan Már Kjartansson

Area
  - Total: 145 km^{2} (56 sq mi)

Population (2021)
  - Total: 19,724
  - Density: 130.49/km^{2} (338.0/sq mi)
- Demonym(s): Reyknesingur, Reyknesingar (Icelandic)
- Postal code(s): 230, 232, 233, 235, 260
- Municipal number: 2000
- Website: reykjanesbaer.is

Reykjanesbær (Icelandic pronunciation: [ˈreiːcaˌnɛsˌpaiːr̥]) is a municipality on the Southern Peninsula (Suðurnes) in Iceland, though the name is also used by locals to refer to the suburban region of Keflavík and Njarðvík which have grown together over the years. The municipality is made up of the towns of Keflavík and Njarðvík and the village of Hafnir. The municipality was created in 1994 when the inhabitants of the three settlements voted to merge them into one. Reykjanesbær is the fourth largest municipality in Iceland, with 21.957 citizens (2024).

== Overview ==
Of the three towns which make up the municipality, Keflavík is the largest, while Hafnir is the smallest and some 10 kilometers distant. Keflavík and Njarðvík were originally distinct towns but gradually grew together over the course of the latter half of the 20th century, until the only thing separating them was a single street. The northern side of the street belonged to Keflavík and the southern side to Njarðvík. Since May 2009, the township of Njarðvík has been the location of the Viking World museum (Víkingaheimar).

In 2006, when the United States Navy closed Naval Air Station Keflavik, the site was taken over by the development agency Kadeco and renamed Ásbrú. A university, Keilir, was founded, and now Ásbrú houses the campuses of various educational institutions and also businesses, both newly founded and relocated to the site of the air base.

== Demographics ==
Residents by citizenship (1 January 2024)
Nationality	Population
Iceland	15,438
Poland	3,471
Lithuania	494
Ukraine	361
Romania	287
Latvia	222
Venezuela	146
Croatia	142
Portugal	123
Spain	84
Palestine	80
Philippines	72
Greece	71
Iraq	62
Syria	50
Bulgaria	47
Estonia	46
Other Europe	370
Africa	122
Other Asia	148
Other Americas	99
Oceania	6
Stateless	6

Reykjanesbær is the most populous municipality in the Suðurnes region, the fourth most populous in Iceland, and the most populous outside of the Greater Reykjavík area. The municipality had a population of 18,920 on 1 January 2019; that is about 5.3% of the country's population. The Suðurnes region, which includes Reykjanesbær and five neighbouring municipalities, was home to 27,113 people; that is about 7.6% of the country's population.

On 1 January 2024, of the town's population of 21,957, immigrants of the first and second generation numbered 5,570 (25.37%). The most common foreign citizens were Poles, Lithuanians, and Ukrainians.

== Points of interest ==
- The Icelandic Museum of Rock 'n' Roll
- Naval Radio Transmitter Facility Grindavik
- Reykjanesviti
- Viking World museum

== Climate ==
Reykjanesbær has a subpolar oceanic (Köppen: Cfc; Trewartha: Eolk), with temperatures rising above 10 °C (50 °F) only in July and August.

Climate data for Reykjanes, 1961–1990 normals, extremes 1949–1998
Month	Jan	Feb	Mar	Apr	May	Jun	Jul	Aug	Sep	Oct	Nov	Dec	Year
Record high °C (°F)	9.2 (48.6)	9.2 (48.6)	9.4 (48.9)	13.0 (55.4)	16.6 (61.9)	18.0 (64.4)	23.1 (73.6)	21.8 (71.2)	17.0 (62.6)	13.8 (56.8)	10.0 (50.0)	10.7 (51.3)	23.1 (73.6)
Mean daily maximum °C (°F)	2.5 (36.5)	3.4 (38.1)	3.6 (38.5)	5.7 (42.3)	8.6 (47.5)	10.8 (51.4)	12.3 (54.1)	12.2 (54.0)	9.7 (49.5)	7.0 (44.6)	4.1 (39.4)	3.0 (37.4)	6.9 (44.4)
Daily mean °C (°F)	0.4 (32.7)	1.2 (34.2)	1.3 (34.3)	3.4 (38.1)	6.0 (42.8)	8.4 (47.1)	10.1 (50.2)	10.0 (50.0)	7.6 (45.7)	5.0 (41.0)	2.0 (35.6)	0.7 (33.3)	4.8 (40.6)
Mean daily minimum °C (°F)	−1.7 (28.9)	−1.0 (30.2)	−1.0 (30.2)	1.2 (34.2)	4.1 (39.4)	6.9 (44.4)	8.4 (47.1)	8.4 (47.1)	5.7 (42.3)	3.0 (37.4)	−0.2 (31.6)	−1.5 (29.3)	2.7 (36.9)
Record low °C (°F)	−18.1 (−0.6)	−16.8 (1.8)	−16.6 (2.1)	−15.5 (4.1)	−6.0 (21.2)	−0.9 (30.4)	0.0 (32.0)	0.4 (32.7)	−3.5 (25.7)	−9.4 (15.1)	−12.5 (9.5)	−15.0 (5.0)	−18.1 (−0.6)
Average precipitation mm (inches)	107.1 (4.22)	94.8 (3.73)	99.4 (3.91)	82.0 (3.23)	66.9 (2.63)	71.1 (2.80)	68.6 (2.70)	97.4 (3.83)	96.9 (3.81)	128.6 (5.06)	95.8 (3.77)	108.0 (4.25)	1,116.8 (43.97)
Source: Icelandic Meteorological Office

== Twin towns – sister cities ==
Reykjanesbær is twinned with:

- Kerava, Finland
- Trollhättan, Sweden

== Gallery ==
Reykjanesbær

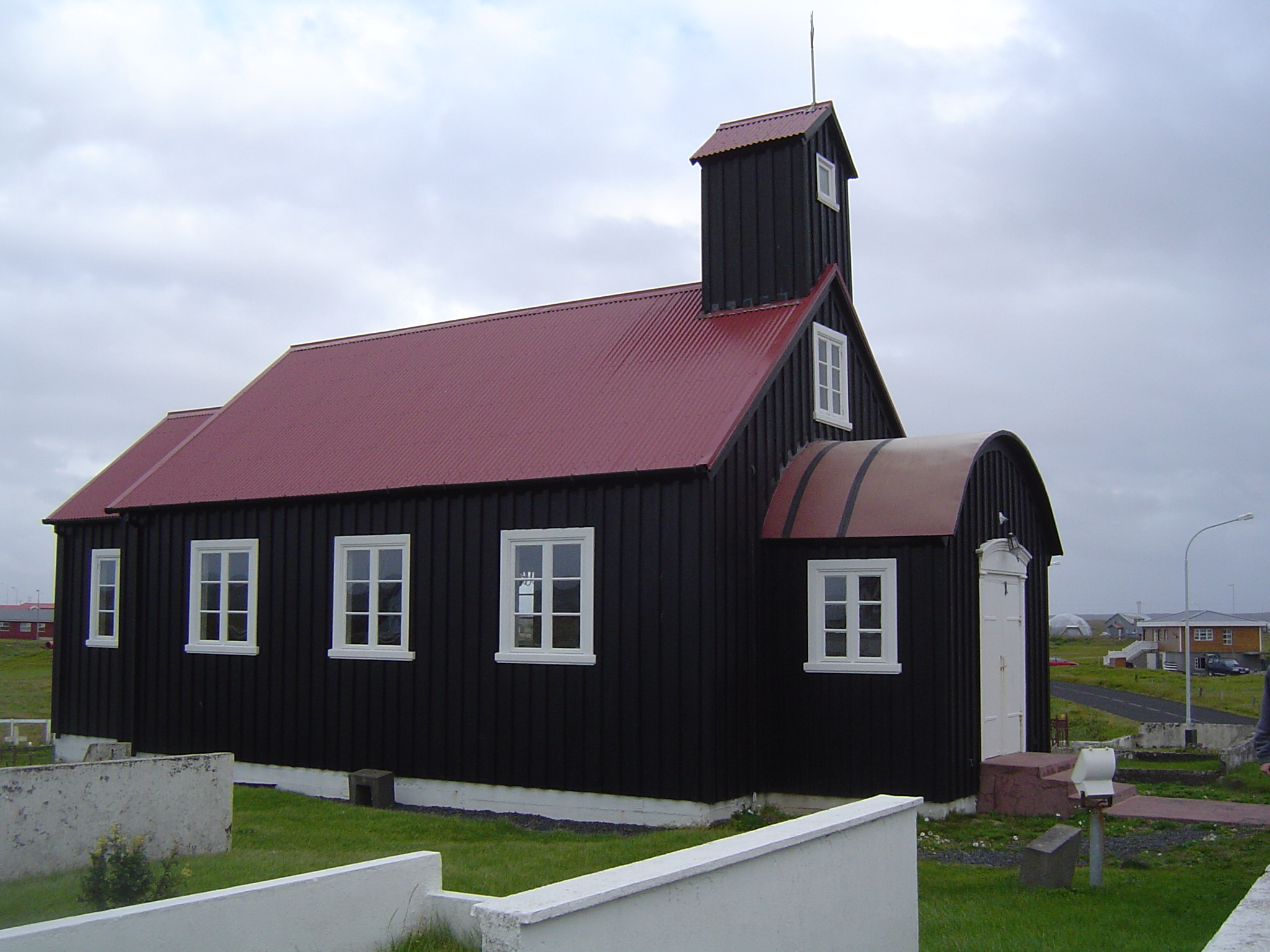
Church of Hafnir (Kirkjuvogskirkja)

Keflavik town center

Old Water Reserve Tank

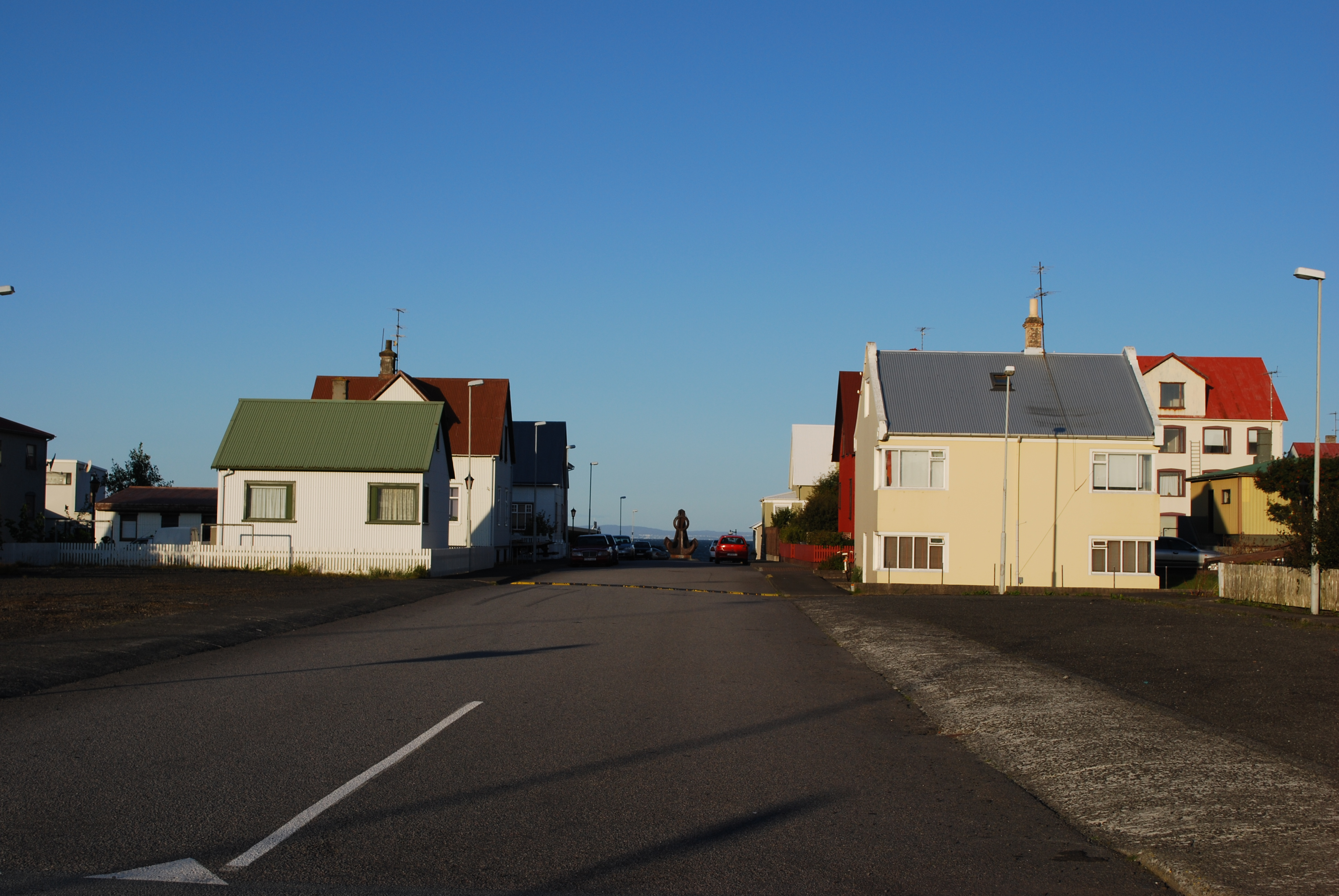
Street in Keflavík

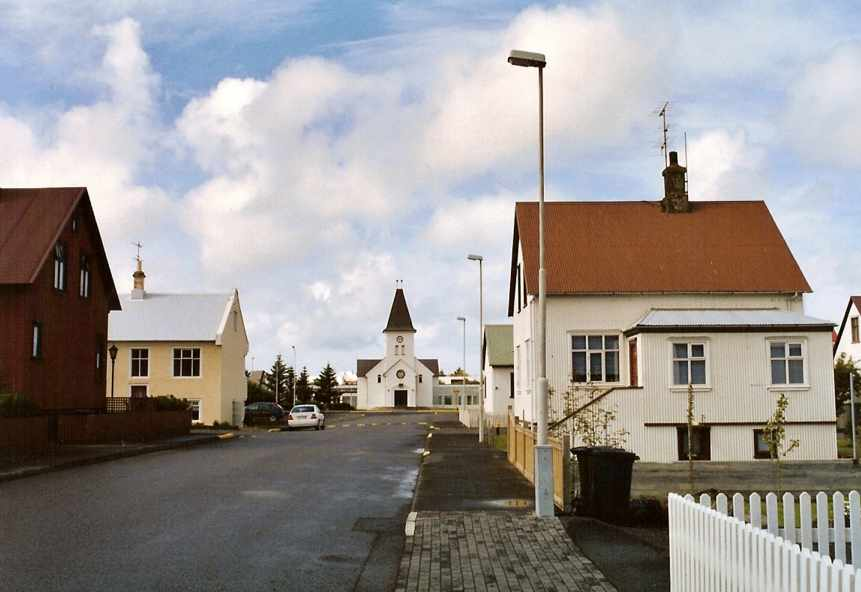
Church of Keflavik

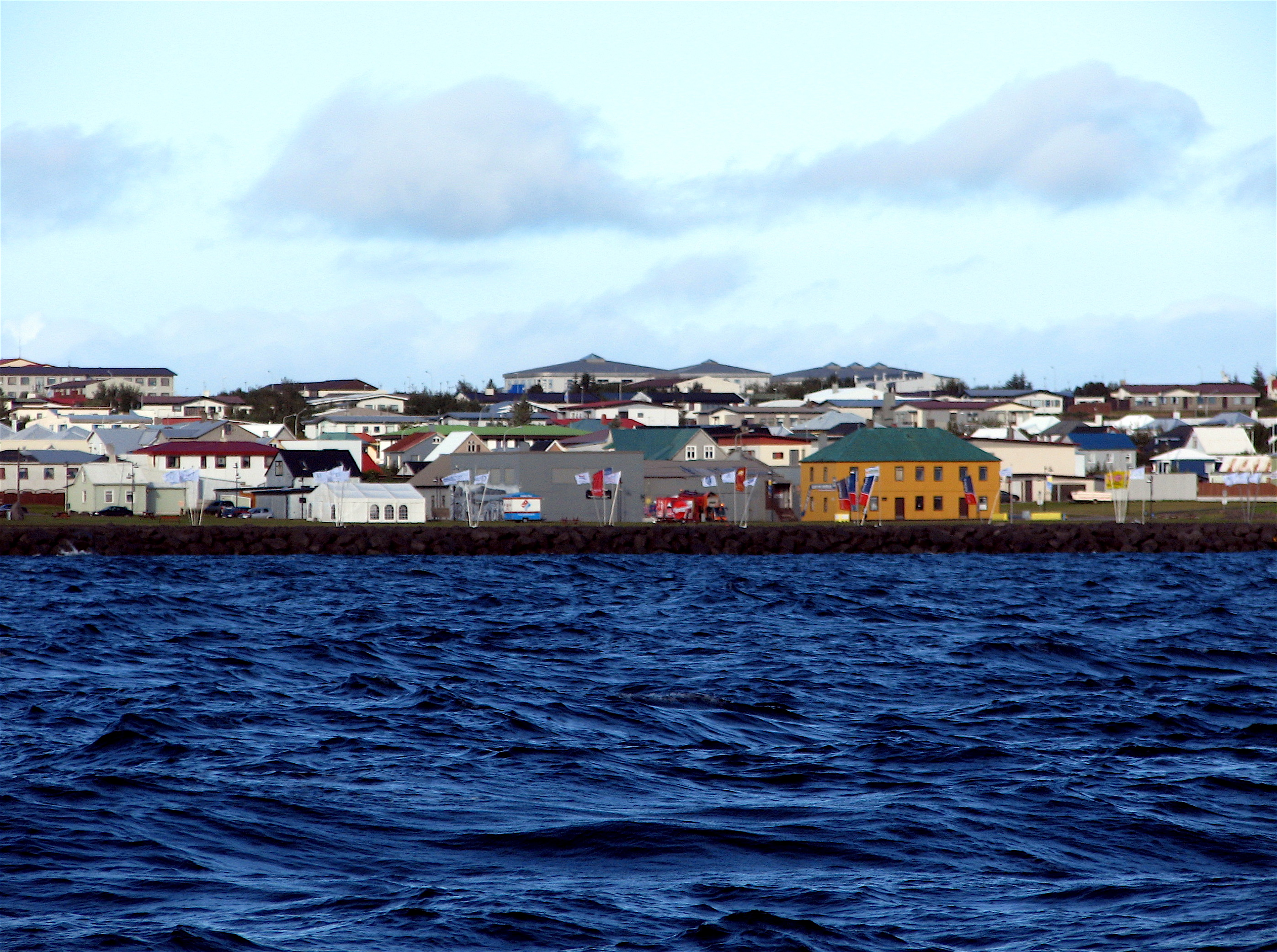
Keflavík harbour

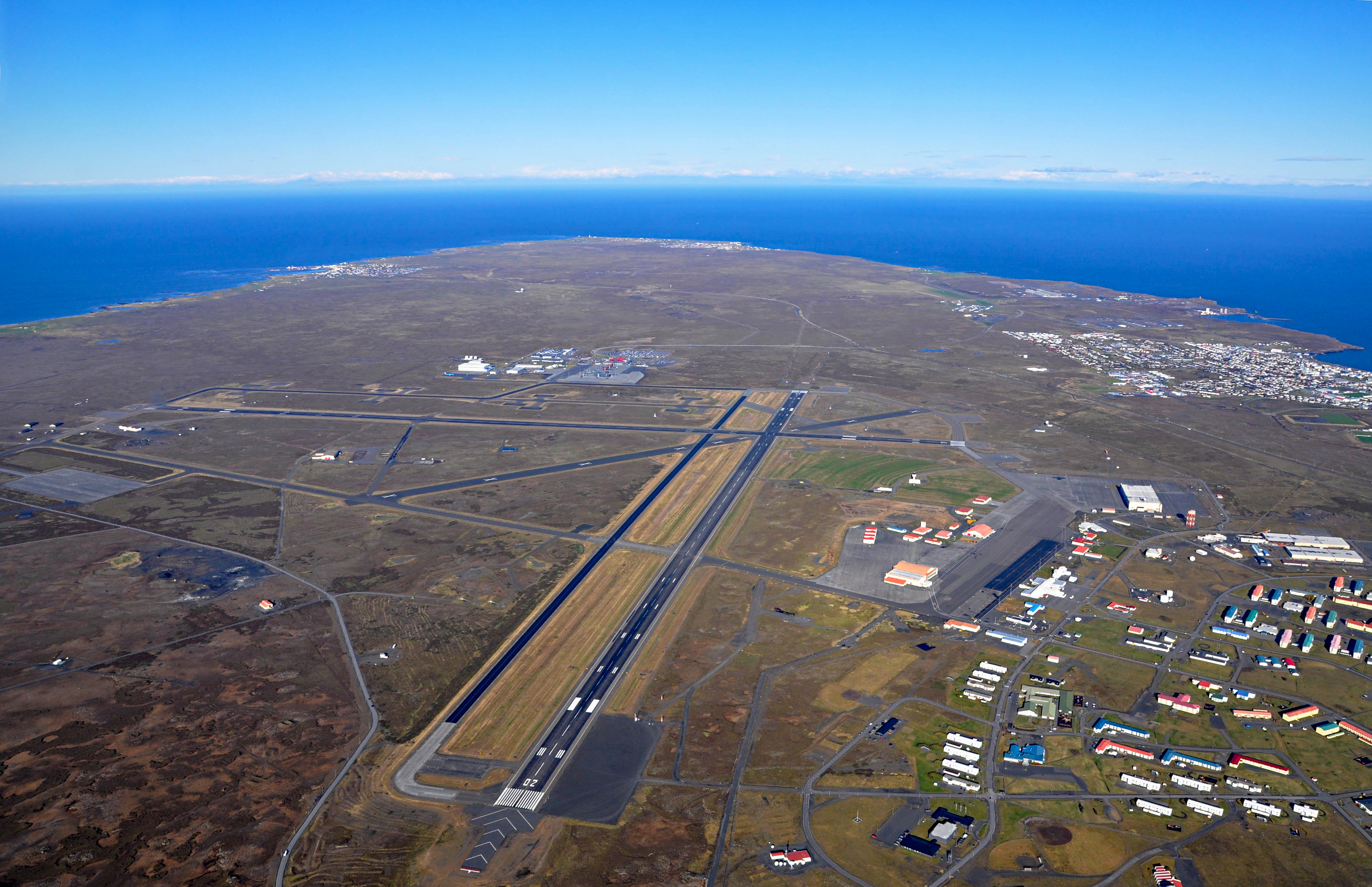
Aerial view of Keflavík International Airport
