= Gunnuhver =

Geothermal hot spring and mud pool area on the Reykjanes Peninsula, Iceland

Coordinates: 63.819861°N 22.687395°W

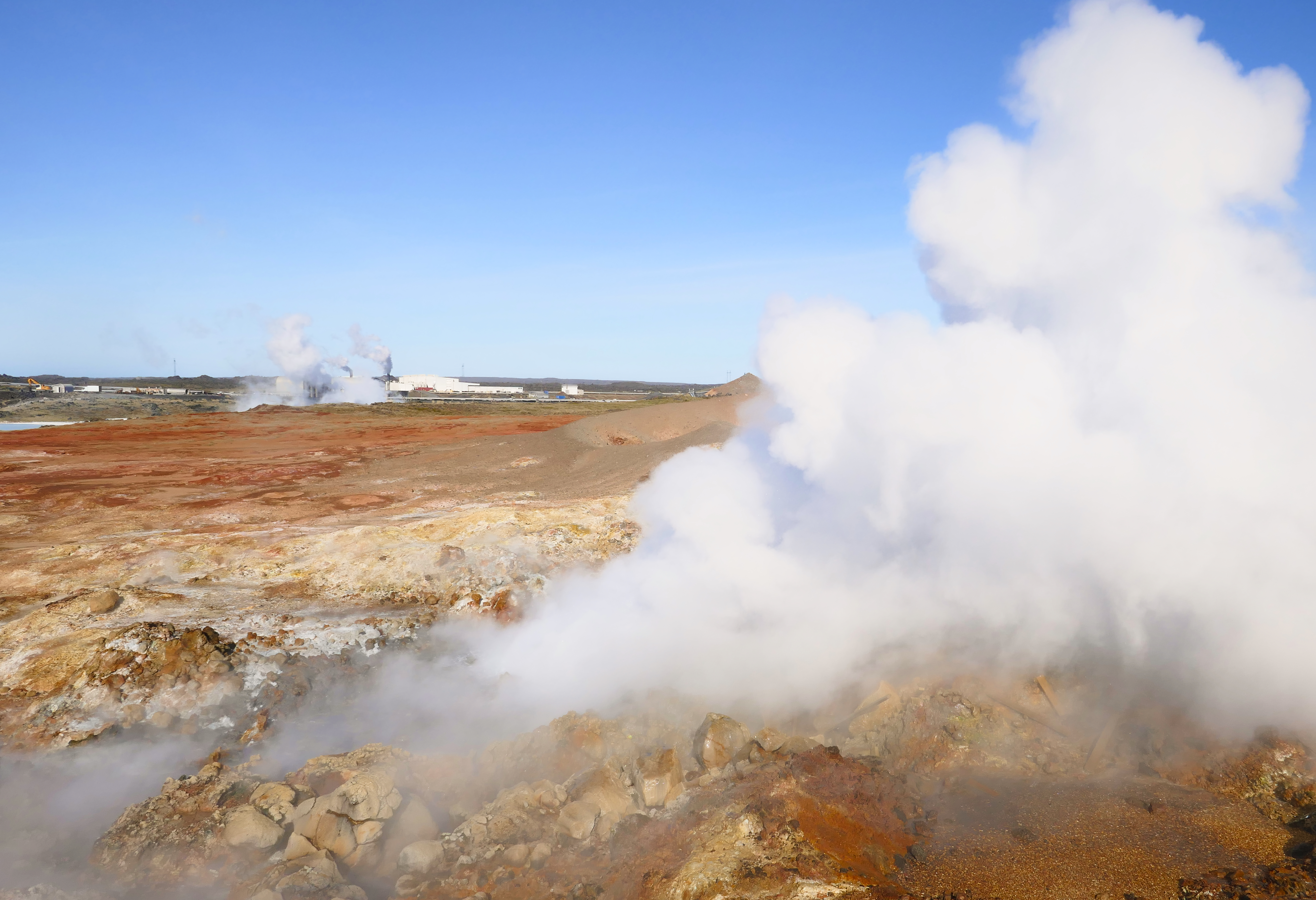
- Interactive map of Gunnuhver
- Location: Reykjanes Peninsula, southwest Iceland
- Type: Geothermal hot springs, mud pots and fumaroles

Gunnuhver (Icelandic: Gunnuhver) is an active geothermal hot spring and a mud pool with fumaroles on the southwestern tip of the Reykjanes Peninsula in Iceland. It lies within the Reykjanes UNESCO Global Geopark and close to the Reykjanesviti lighthouse. The site has been the focus of safety measures and occasional closures due to changing geothermal activity.

== Geography and geology ==
Gunnuhver is located near the ocean at the southwestern point of the Reykjanes Peninsula, within the Reykjanes high temperature geothermal area. The site is characterized by steaming fumaroles, bubbling hot springs and mud pots formed where hydrothermal fluids rise through altered volcanic rocks.

The main mud pool has been described as the largest in Iceland, with a diameter of twenty metres. It is also notable for its hydrothermal fluids that are seawater-derived rather than freshwater, unusual in Iceland. Gunnuhver forms part of the tectonically active Reykjanes volcanic system at the landward end of the Mid-Atlantic Ridge.

== History and folklore ==
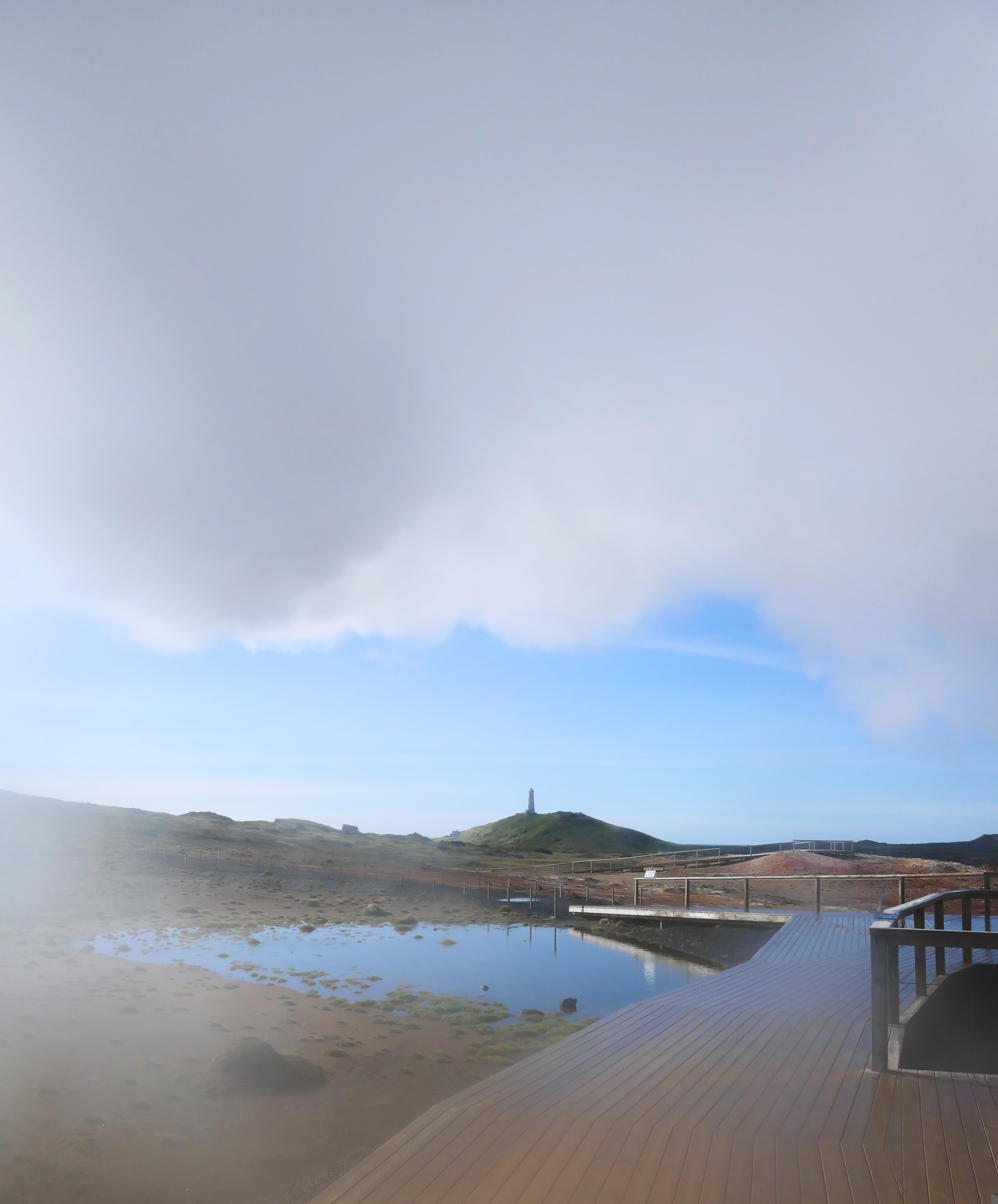
The Reykjanesviti lighthouse visible through the steam at Gunnuhver

Written descriptions of geothermal areas on the Reykjanes Peninsula appear in 18th-century travel accounts by Eggert Ólafsson, who documented Iceland's landscapes during a survey journey made between 1752 and 1757.

An Icelandic folktale links the name 'Gunnuhver' ('Gunna's hot spring') to Guðrún Önundardóttir ("Gunna"), a woman said to have quarreled with her landlord, Vilhjálmur Jónsson, over unpaid rent and the seizure of her cooking pot. After Gunna's death, the story relates that she haunted the area until the pastor Eiríkur of Vogsósar lured her spirit toward a hot spring using a ball of yarn; in many versions the ghost falls into the steaming pool, and the place thereafter bears her name. Variants of the tale differ on details but share the association of the springs with Gunna's ghost.

== Access, safety and management ==
Walkways and viewing platforms provide accessible, controlled access around active vents and mud pools. However, increased activity has prompted temporary closures. In September 2014 the area was closed after a sharp rise in mud-geyser activity damaged infrastructure and created hazards. Access and roads in the Reykjanes headland have also been adjusted at times for maintenance and, during the 2023–2024 increased seismic activity on the peninsula, to accommodate civil protection measures. Local authorities reported the road to Reykjanesviti and Gunnuhver open to visitors as conditions allowed.

== Recent activity ==
The Reykjanes Peninsula has experienced renewed volcanic and seismic unrest since 2021, affecting access policies across parts of the geopark. Authorities and regional organisations have provided ongoing updates as conditions change.
