= Asbru =

Asbru may refer to:

- A bridge in Norse mythology also called Bifrost
- Asbru (area), a university and entrepreneur area next to the Keflavik International Airport in Reykjanesbaer, Iceland
