= Víkurfréttir =

Icelandic newspaper

Víkurfréttir is the main newspaper of the Icelandic town of Keflavík.

The newspaper was founded in Southern Peninsula in August 1980. In 1983, it was bought by the current owner, Páll Ketilsson. It is a weekly but was for a while published twice a week.
