= Blue diamond (disambiguation) =

A blue diamond is a diamond whose color is blue due to boron impurities.

Blue diamond may also refer to:

== Locations ==
- Blue Diamond (building) a skyscraper in Miami Beach, United States (Twin Tower is called Green Diamond)
- Blue Diamond, Kentucky, an unincorporated community in the United States
- Blue Diamond, Nevada, a census-designated place in Clark County, Nevada, United States
- Blue Diamond (Iceland), a tourist route in Iceland

== Music ==
- Blue Diamond (album), a 1999 album by Sonny Rhodes
- The Blue Diamonds (duo), a Dutch 1960s rock and roll duo
- "Blue Diamond", the original title of "Big Blue Diamonds", a song recorded by Gene Summers
- "Blue Diamonds", a song from Rusted Root's 2002 album Welcome to My Party
- "Blue Diamonds", a song from The Long Winters' 2003 album When I Pretend to Fall

== Organizations ==
- Blue Diamond (bus company), a bus company in West Midlands, England
- Blue Diamond Garden Centres, a British chain of garden centres, restaurants, and other businesses
- Blue Diamond Growers, a California-based agricultural cooperative and marketing organization that specializes in almonds
- Blue Diamond Society, an LGBT rights organisation in Nepal
- Blue Diamond Truck Company, a joint venture between Ford Motor Company and Navistar International
- Blue Diamonds (aerobatic team), aerobatic display team of the Philippine Air Force
- No. 92 Squadron RAF, "Blue Diamonds", an aerobatic display team

== Other ==
- A viagra tablet
- Blue Diamond (character), a 1940s superhero from Timely Comics, a forerunner of Marvel Comics
- Blue diamond impatiens, a flowering plant of the family Balsaminaceae
- The Blue Diamond Affair, a series of events triggered by the 1989 theft of gems belonging to the Saudi royal family
- Nickname of the United States Navy Strike Fighter Squadron 146
- Blue Diamond, a character on the Cartoon Network show Steven Universe
