= Eldeyjarboði =

Island in Iceland

Coordinates: 63°29′N 23°48′W

Eldeyjarboði (Icelandic pronunciation: [ˈɛltˌeiːjarˌpɔːðɪ]) is a blind skerry located about 57 km southwest of Reykjanes, Iceland. It is part of the Mid-Atlantic Ridge.

A submarine eruption occurred in 1830.

In January 2020 the Icelandic Met Office stated that two earthquakes occurred 26 km southwest and 32 km south-southwest of Eldeyjarboði.

== See also ==
- Nýey, a nearby eruptive island that appeared and disappeared in 1783/4.
- List of volcanic eruptions in Iceland
- Volcanism of Iceland
- Geology of Iceland
- List of volcanoes in Iceland
- Geological deformation of Iceland

== Sources ==
- Vísindavefurinn: "How common are new islands in eruptions?“ by Professor Sigurður Steinþórsson, 9 June 2005.]
