= Geirfuglasker =

Icelandic isle that no longer exists

Coordinates: 63.669535°N 23.2850°W

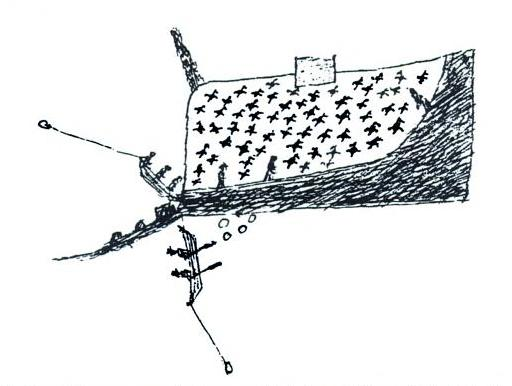
18th-century sketch of Geirfuglasker

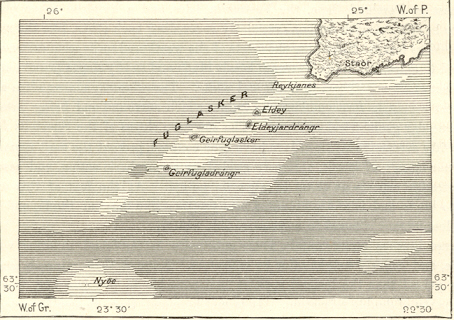
Former location of Geirfuglasker among the Fuglasker islands

Geirfuglasker (Icelandic pronunciation: [ˈceirˌfʏklaˌscɛːr̥], "Great Auk Rock") was a small islet near Reykjanes, Iceland. It was volcanic rock with steep sides except for two landing places. The rough surf around the island usually made it inaccessible to humans, and one of the last refuges for the flightless bird the great auk (which was also called "garefowl" — "geirfugl" in Icelandic). In a volcanic eruption in 1830 this rock submerged. The surviving great auks moved to a nearby island called Eldey and were wiped out by humans in 1840. Later a new Geirfuglasker appeared on the site.

Another island named Geirfuglasker is east of Surtsey in the Vestmannaeyjar.

== In literature ==
It, and the fate of the great auk, is mentioned (spelled "Gairfowlskerry") in The Water-Babies, A Fairy Tale for a Land Baby by Charles Kingsley.

== See also ==
- Nýey, island south-west of Geirfuglasker.
