= Blue Diamond (Iceland) =

Tourist route in Iceland

The Blue Diamond is a tourist route in Iceland covering about 50 km looping from Reykjavik into the Reykjanes Peninsula and back. . The peninsula, and therefore the area the route covers, occupies a total of around 2,000 square kilometers. Since 2015, the peninsula doubles as a UNESCO Global Geopark.

The primary stops on the Blue Diamond route in the Reykjanes Geopark are Gunnuhver (largest mud geyser in Iceland), Valahnúkur, Walk inside a crater – Stamparnir, The Raven Rift (just like in Þingvellir – Almannagjá), The Bridge Between Continents, Reykjanes lighthouse, Friðrik VIII, Presidents hill, Power Plant Earth, Fire Island, Krísuvík, Seltún, Vikingworld, Kvikan – House of Culture and Natural Resources and the Blue Lagoon. Other stops include The Icelandic Museum of Rock 'n' Roll, Duushús : culture and art center, Sudurnes Science and Learning Center Sandgerði, Flösin Garðskaga, Stafnes church and the Svartsengi and Reykjanesvirkjun geothermal power plants.

Coordinates: 63.91, -22.47
