= Nýey =

Former island in Iceland

Coordinates: 63°29′25″N 23°48′9″W

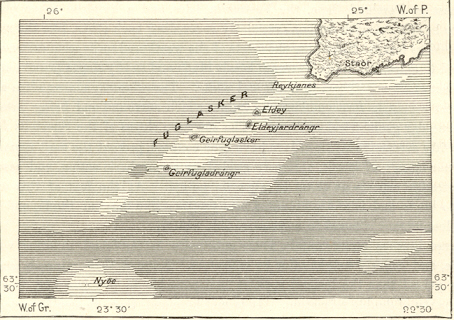
1890s wood engraving of the Fuglasker islands with Nýey (labelled Nyøe) in the south-west

Nýey (Icelandic pronunciation: [ˈniːˌeiː]), Nýeyjar [ˈniːˌeiːjar̥], Nyø (Danish), was a small, uninhabited island that formed in 1783 due to an underwater eruption in the Mid-Atlantic Ridge southwest of Reykjanes, Iceland. It disappeared within a year.

== History ==
The formation of "Nýeyjar" began on May 1, 1783. It attracted a lot of attention and some connected it to the 1783 Calabrian earthquakes.

The captain of a 'small ship' ("is: húkkerta") that sailed in the area, wrote in his diary about a burning island 15.7 km (9.8 mi) due southwest of Geirfuglasker. He tried to observe it but had to stay over half a mile away, due to the poisonous sulphurous smoke.

King Christian VII of Denmark named the island "Nýey", ordered an expedition to it, and dedicated it to the monarchy with a Danish flag. He also planned for an inscribed stone to be placed on the island.

It had disappeared by the summer of 1784, when Magnús Stephensen (Lawyer and Supreme Court Judge), planned to dedicate it to the king whilst en route to Copenhagen.

== See also ==
- Eldeyjarboði a nearby eruptive skerry on the same ridge.
- List of volcanic eruptions in Iceland
- Volcanism of Iceland
- Geology of Iceland
- List of volcanoes in Iceland
- Geological deformation of Iceland

== Sources ==
- Vísindavefurinn : " How common are new islands in eruptions? “ (Vísindavefurinn|5044|Hversu algengt er að nýjar eyjar verði til í eldgosum?)
