= Keilir (educational institution) =

Coordinates: 63°58′07″N 22°34′13″W

Keilir – Atlantic Centre of Excellence
- Type: Private/Non-profit
- Established: 2007
- Director: Jóhann Friðrik Friðriksson, chief executive officer and Kjartan Már Kjartansson, chairman of the board
- Location: Reykjanesbær, Iceland
- Affiliations: University of Iceland and other institutions, energy and engineering firms
- Website: www.keilir.net

Keilir – Atlantic Centre of Excellence (Icelandic: Keilir, miðstöð vísinda, fræða og atvinnulífs) is a private, non-profit, international educational institution located in Ásbrú next to Keflavik International Airport in the city of Reykjanesbær in Iceland. The school was established in 2007.

The school is owned by the University of Iceland and Icelandic companies. Among the shareholders are Icelandair Group, HS Geothermal Power, Reykjavik Energy, Icelandic Geosurvey, Geysir Green Energy.

Keilir is divided into five schools: Keilir Aviation Academy, Keilir Health Academy, Ásbrú gymnasium, The Icelandic School of Occupational Safety and the University Bridge.

== Accreditation ==
Keilir graduates its university level students through its affiliation with the University of Iceland which is accredited higher education institution in Iceland under the recent Higher Education Act in Iceland, No. 63/2006, for each of its academic subject areas.

== Aviation academy ==
In 2019, Keilir Aviation Academy merged with the Icelandic Flight school making it one of the largest Flight schools in Scandinavia, with its around 20 aircraft, flight simulators and over three hundred students. The School offers courses both in Reykjavík and Ásbrú in Reykjanesbær, and students at each location have the option to fly from either Reykjavik Airport or Keflavik International Airport.

Keilir Aviation Academy offers professional flight training, headed by a staff of airline pilots and instructors along with housing and Diamond DA20 Katana, Diamond DA40 Diamond Star and Diamond DA42 Twin Star aircraft. As a former NATO base in Iceland, Keflavik International Airport (BIKF) has two 3,000m runways and is the Icelandic gateway between Europe and the United States. The Diamond aircraft are made of carbon fiber materials. The engines on the DA-40 are Centurion Engines 2.0 liter diesel engines with FADEC (Full Authority Digital Engine Control). In the same manner, the flight instruments are electronic as well, the Garmin G1000 Integrated Flight Deck is used to display the necessary information.

== Keilir Health Academy ==
The leading courses available at the school include Level 4 Personal Training, Strength and Conditioning, Nordic Fitness Education and an eight-month university program to become an Adventure Guide in cooperation with Thompson Rivers University in Canada.

=== Nordic Personal Trainer Certificate ===
Keilir Heath Academy has been educating personal trainers in Iceland since 2007 through the established IAK personal trainer programme. Keilir now offers courses through its online school, Nordic Fitness education. The Nordic Personal Trainer Certificate (NPTC) is an online course. The NPTC programme is a blended learning programme.

=== Adventure Studies ===
The program for adventure guides is an introduction to adventure sports and the adventure industry, in partnership with the accrediting body Thompson Rivers University, with extensive time on field activity courses and compressed and modularized classroom course instruction. The program is a 30 credit certificated intensive, with the option to extend to a 60 credit diploma program.

== Ásbrú Gymnasium ==
Ásbrú Gymnasium or Menntaskólinn á Ásbrú is a junior college located on the Keilir campus. It offers a program in Game Development developed in cooperation with IGI or Icelandic Game Industry, in which students take courses in game design, programming, marketing, philosophy and project management along with the requisite courses for a junior college degree.

== Icelandic School of Occupational Safety ==
The Icelandic School of Occupational Safety or Vinnuverndarskóli Íslands is the newest addition under the umbrella of Keilir. The school holds regular courses both in Keilir and Rafmennt as well as instructors traveling to lifelong learning centers around Iceland or visiting the companies themselves.

== University Bridge ==
The University Bridge or Háskólabrú is a program of Preliminary University Studies for adults in collaboration with the University of Iceland. The main objective is to prepare students, who do not fulfill admission qualification, with the knowledge and competence necessary for further studies at university level. Completion of studies in the Department of Preliminary University Studies prepares the student for admittance to most Universities in Iceland pursuing to a contract between Keilir, the University of Iceland and the Ministry of Education. The aim is to prepare student for challenging university study both in Iceland and abroad. The department offers the possibility of distance learning as well as traditional on-site studies.
