= Ásbrú =

Coordinates: 63°58′3″N 22°34′44″W

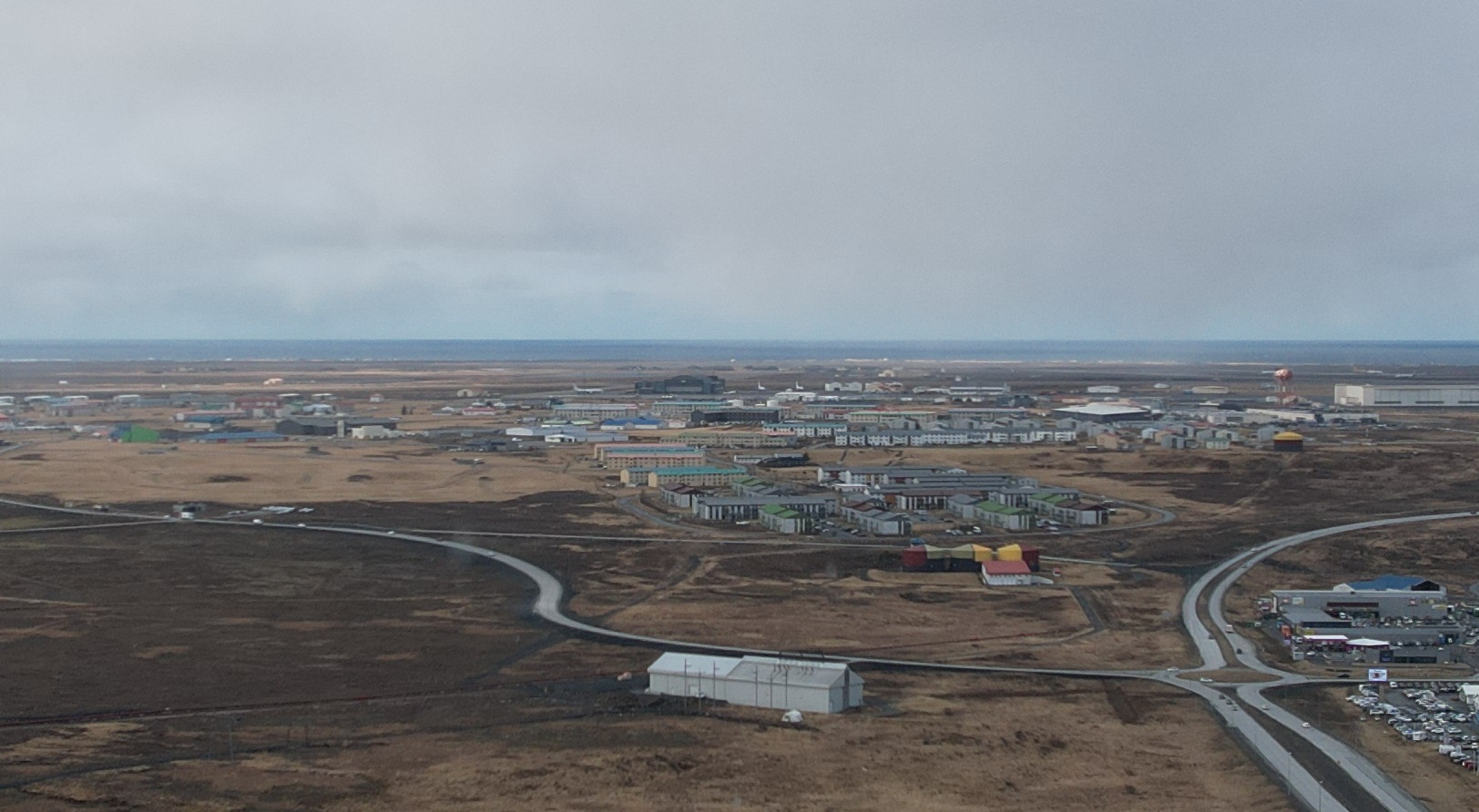
Aerial view of Ásbrú

Ásbrú logo

Ásbrú (Icelandic pronunciation: [ˈauːsˌpruː]) is a part of the former U.S. Naval Air Station Keflavik now supervised by the Icelandic defense authorities. After U.S. forces abandoned the base in 2006, a part of the base not needed for current military defense needs, was re-invented as a community of entrepreneurs, students and business. Ásbrú offers academic programs at Keilir, has the largest university campus in Iceland, one of the largest business incubators in Iceland, as well as many other projects such as Iceland’s first international Data center. Ásbrú is located within the municipality of Reykjanesbær.

== History ==
From the Second World War, the United States Navy and later, the North Atlantic Treaty Organization or NATO had facilities at the Keflavik International Airport. The base was known as Naval Air Station Keflavik or NASKEF. In September 2006, the US military abandoned the base and the Icelandic authorities were given full command over the area.

Ásbrú is another name in Old Norse for Bifröst, the burning bridge that reaches between Midgard (Earth) and Asgard, the realm of the gods, meaning "Æsir's bridge" or "bridge of the gods".

== Kadeco ==
Keflavik Airport Development Company or Kadeco was founded by the Icelandic government on 24 October 2006 following the deactivation of the Naval Air Station Keflavik. KADECO is a private limited liability company owned by the State that is intended to guide the development of the Keflavik Airport Area and alteration of the former military area. The object of establishing the company was to ensure that properties owned by the State in the area are put into organized, advantageous civil use as soon as possible, with the goal of ensuring that positive social effects will be as substantial as possible and that negative impacts on nearby society would be as minimal as possible. Since 2020 Kadeco´s role has been to deliver a masterplan for the area around Keflavik airport which was delivered in March 2023 and presented as a unified vision for the area development under the K64 brand, K referring to Kadeco and Keflavik and 64 to the latitude where the area is located.

== Education ==
The first development project was founding a center of education, called Keilir, Atlantic Center of Excellence, which was established during the summer of 2007. Keilir has four core fields: green energy, aviation, creative studies and health studies.

Keilir began gradually with a pre-university diploma and graduated 85 people after only one year of operation Fall 2008 there are over 400 students at Keilir, many of them doing university level studies. The Keilir Aviation Academy has recently purchased brand new teaching airplanes and will start aircraft mechanics courses next year. Keilir has a green energy engineers' degree which is focusing on renewable resources. Keilir has been making research agreements with several companies in green energy fields such as wind pumping.

== Student campus ==
In August 2007 some of the apartments in the area were converted into student housing. In February 2008, A large part of the available apartments on the base were sold to one large investor, which continued developing the University Campus, the largest one in Iceland. In November 2008 there are 1.800 inhabitants on the campus both students at Keilir as well as students at other universities in Reykjavik. Connected to the University campus there is a student orientated restaurant and café opened and a convenience store.

== Data Center ==
Verne Global, a start-up company jointly owned by international investment companies Novator Partners, General Catalyst Partners and The Wellcome Trust, has purchased buildings to operate a data center. This will be the first green data center in the world. The total investment of the first phase is expected to be around 300 million USD.

== Entrepreneurs ==
Eldey incubation center was opened during the fall of 2008. Eldey is a joint venture between Kadeco, Keilir, Innovation Center Iceland and the University of Iceland. One of the entrepreneurs in the Ásbrú area is HBT which has created an electric power quality correction device called El Correct.
