= Eldey =

Island of Iceland

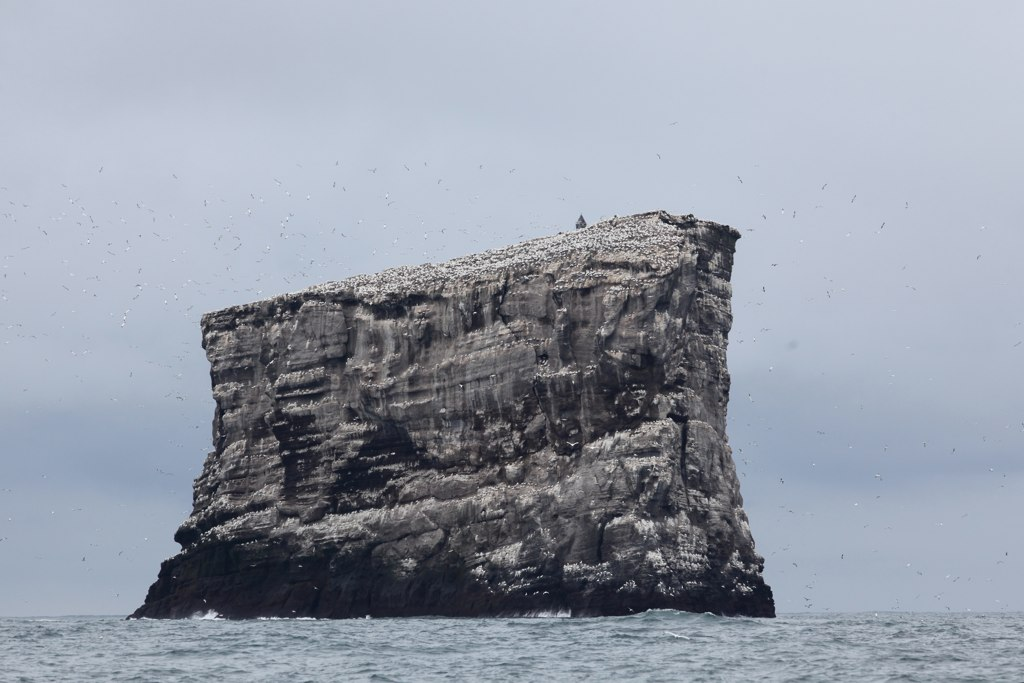
- Eldey in July 2010
- Interactive map of Eldey

Geography
- Location: Atlantic Ocean
- Coordinates: 63°44′27.2″N 22°57′27.2″W
- Area: 3 ha (7.4 acres)
- Highest elevation: 77 m (253 ft)

Administration
- Iceland

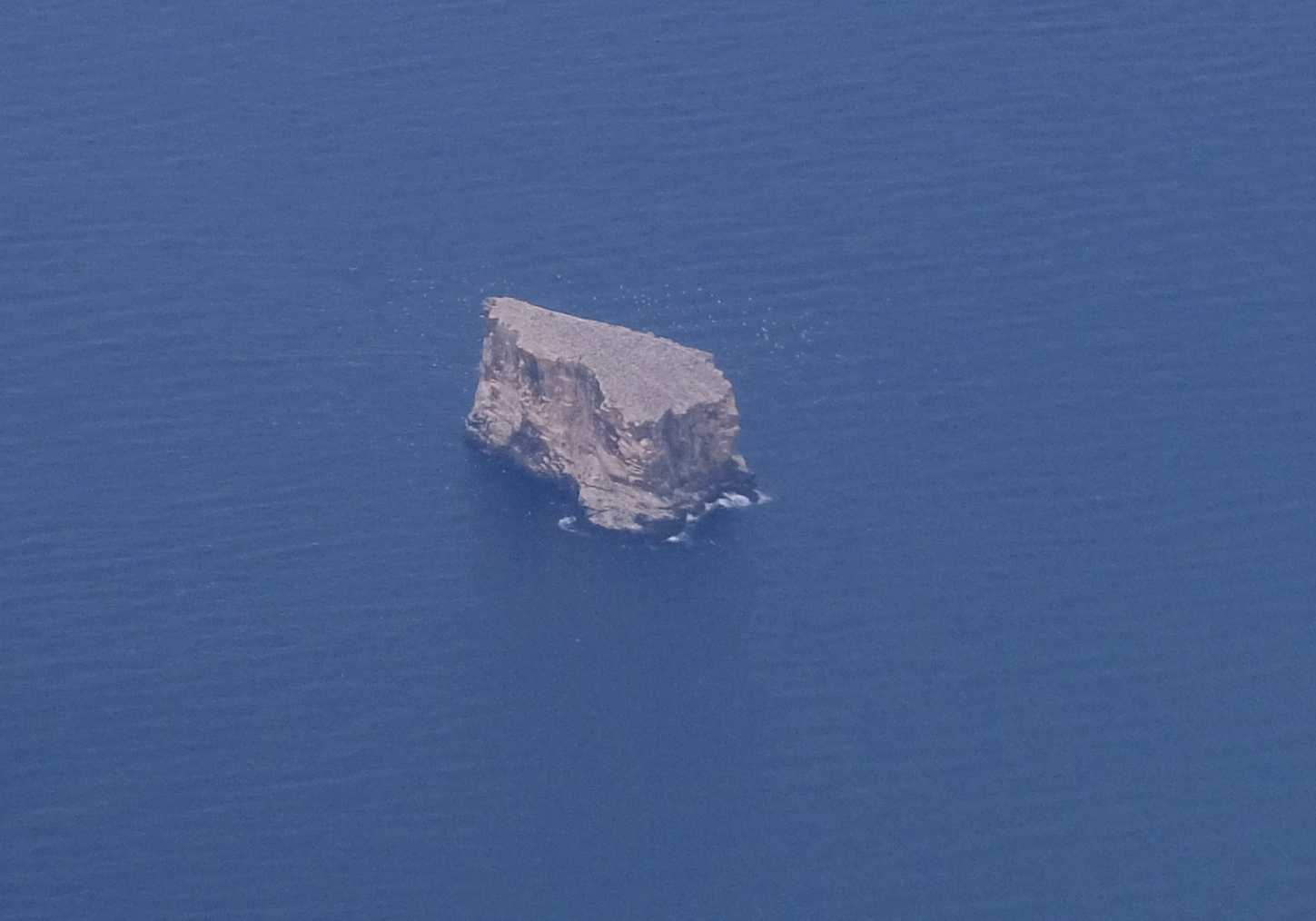
Aerial photograph

Eldey (Icelandic pronunciation: [ˈɛltˌeiː]) is a small, uninhabited island about 13 kilometres (7 nautical miles) off the coast of the Reykjanes Peninsula in southwest Iceland. Located west-southwest of Reykjavík, the island of Eldey covers an area of about 3 hectares (7 acres), and rises to a height of 77 metres (253 ft). Its sheer cliffs are home to large numbers of birds, including one of the largest northern gannet colonies in the world, with around 16,000 pairs. This colony can now be watched live via two webcams that are located on top of the island.

== Volcanic system ==
The Eldey and Geirfuglasker volcanic systems together form the 40 km (25 mi) long Eldey volcanic system on the Reykjanes Ridge. The erupted rocks are from the tholeiitic magma series and picrite basalt. There is not a central volcano, but rather a number of flat-topped, elongated ridges arranged in an echelon fashion. Conical-, fissure- or shield-like volcanoes are superimposed on these ridges. Eldey, and the smaller skerries of Eldeyjardrangur, Geirfugladrangur and Geirfuglasker are the tops of historic volcanoes in the system.

The Mid-Atlantic Ridge becomes at the Bight transform fault near 56.5°N the Reykjanes Ridge, which extends 900 km (560 mi) north to Iceland's Reykjanes Peninsula at 63.87°N As it approaches Iceland, the ridge becomes shallower, with a thickening of the oceanic crust beneath as it approaches the mantle plume associated with the Iceland hotspot. The Reykjanes Ridge has an average spreading rate of about 20 mm (0.79 in)/year.

The latest confirmed eruption of the Eldey axial volcanic ridge occurred at its northern extremity in 1926, and it may have been active in 1970. A tephra eruption northwest of Eldey dusted the western shore of the Reykjanes Peninsula of Iceland, which occurred in June 1879. Geirfuglasker erupted in 1879 and there were 3 eruptions near Eldey between 1211 and 1422. A small geothermal area is located at 60–80 m (200–260 ft) depth east of Eldey.

== The last of the great auks ==
The island formerly supported the last remnant population of the flightless great auks, after the birds moved there from Geirfuglasker following a volcanic eruption in 1830. When the colony was discovered in 1835, almost fifty birds were counted. Museums, desiring the skins of the auk for preservation and display, quickly began collecting birds from the colony. The last pair, found incubating an egg, were killed there in June 1844, when Icelandic sailors Jón Brandsson and Sigurður Ísleifsson strangled the adults and Ketill Ketilsson accidentally cracked the last egg of the species with his boot during the struggle.

== In literature ==
- Eldey, and the fate of the great auk, are mentioned in The Water-Babies, A Fairy Tale for a Land Baby by Charles Kingsley.
- Eldey is described in detail in The Sixth Extinction: An Unnatural History by Elizabeth Kolbert.
- The Great Auk, a novel by Allan W. Eckert, c. 1963, Library of Congress Cat.#63-18215
- ”The Last of Its Kind: The Search for the Great Auk and the Discovery of Extinction” by Gisli Pálsson, c. 2024, Princeton University Press
