= The Icelandic Museum of Rock 'n' Roll =

Music museum in Reykjanesbær, Iceland

Coordinates: 63°59′23″N 22°32′59″W

The Icelandic Museum of Rock 'n' Roll (Icelandic: Rokksafn Íslands [ˈrɔhkˌsapn ˈistlan(t)s]) is located at the Hljómahöll concert and conference hall in Reykjanesbær. It was formally opened on April 5, 2014.

The museum portrays the history of Icelandic pop and rock music from 1920 to the present. Artists portrayed include Björk, Sigur Rós, Of Monsters and Men, Hljómar, Hjaltalín and Mugison.

On March 15, 2015 the museum opened its first exhibition. The exhibition features Icelandic artist Páll Óskar Hjálmtýsson [also known as: Paul Oscar]. The exhibition is titled „Einkasafn poppstjörnu“ (translation: The Private Collection of a Pop Star). The exhibit features a timeline on his life and music career, a mixing board where guests can mix his songs, a karaoke booth where guests can sing along to his songs and has over 40 tailor made costumes from throughout his career. The oldest costume dating to 1991 when Páll Óskar performed in The Rocky Horror Show with Menntaskólinn við Hamrahlíð. The exhibition is narrated by Páll Óskar on video displays in the exhibition.

== See also ==
- List of music museums
