= Reykjanesviti =

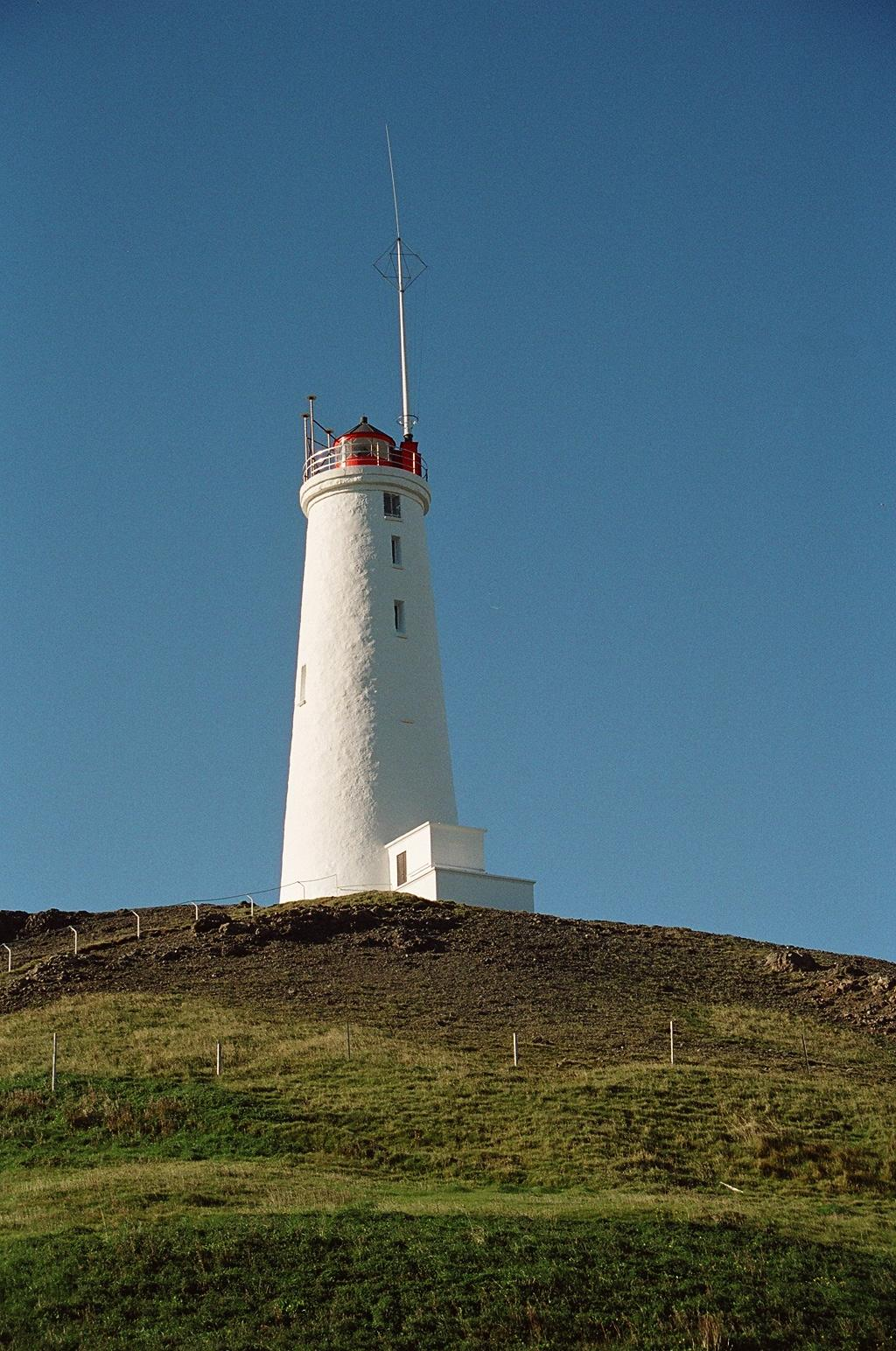
- Location: Reykjanes peninsula
- Coordinates: 63.815673°N 22.704197°W

Tower
- Constructed: 1878
- Construction: concrete tower
- Height: 31 metres (102 ft)
- Shape: tapered cylindrical tower with balcony and lantern
- Markings: white tower, red lantern room

Light
- First lit: 1929
- Focal height: 73 metres (240 ft)
- Range: 22 nmi (41 km; 25 mi)
- Characteristic: Fl (2) W 30 s.
- Iceland no.: VIT-001

Reykjanesviti (Icelandic pronunciation: [ˈreiːcaˌnɛːsˌvɪːtɪ]) is Iceland's oldest lighthouse, located at Reykjanestá. It serves as a landfall light for Reykjavík and Keflavík.

== History ==
The tower is a 31 metres (102 ft) tall construction, situated on the southwestern edge of the Reykjanes peninsula. The original structure was built in 1878; just eight years later the building was destroyed by an earthquake. In 1929 the current Reykjanesviti lighthouse, a concrete construction yet with traditional looks, was illuminated. Its focal plane measures 73 metres above sea level.

The light characteristic is "Fl (2) W 30 s.", i.e. a group of two flashing lights every 30 seconds. An antenna for the transmission of DGPS-signals in the longwave range is mounted on the rooftop. There is also a two-story keeper's residence built in the modern area, and the lighthouse has a resident keeper. The lighthouse is located near an area of thermal activity, and steam from this source is often seen in photographs of the lighthouse.

== See also ==
- List of lighthouses in Iceland
