= Southern Peninsula (Iceland) =

Region of Iceland

Southern Peninsula Suðurnes (Icelandic)
- Region
- The Suðurnes area
- Coordinates: 63°54′N 22°15′W
- Country: Iceland
- Largest town: Reykjanesbær

Area
  - Total: 813 km^{2} (314 sq mi)

Population (2024)
  - Total: 30,933
  - Density: 38.05/km^{2} (98.5/sq mi)
- Time zone: UTC+00:00 (WET)
  - Summer (DST): (Not Observed)
- ISO 3166 code: IS-2

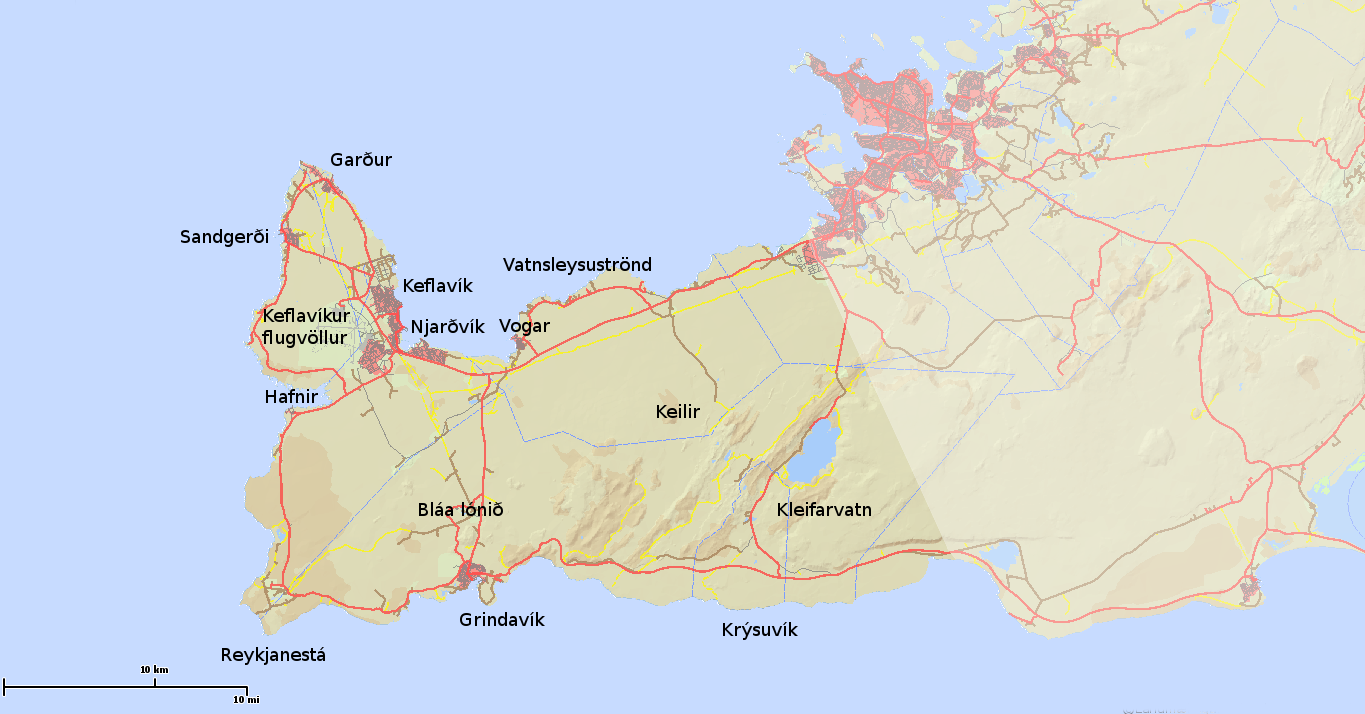
Map of the Suðurnes region

Southern Peninsula (Icelandic: Suðurnes, pronounced [ˈsʏːðʏrˌnɛːs]) is an administrative unit and part of Reykjanesskagi (pronounced [ˈreiːcaˌnɛsˌskaijɪ]), or Reykjanes Peninsula, a region in southwest Iceland. It was named after Reykjanes, the southwestern tip of Reykjanesskagi.

The region has a population of 30,933 (2024) and is one of the more densely populated parts of the island. The administrative centre is Keflavík, which had 7,000 residents when it merged with the nearby town of Njarðvík and Hafnir in 1995 to create Reykjanesbær, which is the largest settlement outside the Greater Reykjavík area; in 2018, the region had a population of 17,805. The region is the location of Keflavík International Airport, the major point of entry for Iceland. Some fishing towns, such as Grindavík, Njarðvík and Sandgerði, are situated on the peninsula.

The peninsula is marked by active volcanism under its surface and large lava fields, allowing little vegetation. There are numerous hot springs in the southern half of the peninsula, around the Kleifarvatn lake and the Krýsuvík geothermal area. There is a geothermal power station at Svartsengi. Near the power station, a luxury spa and pool area has been installed. Using the hot and mineralized water coming down from the power station; the spa is known as the "Blue Lagoon" (Bláa Lónið).

The Bridge Between Continents spans the Álfagjá [ˈaulvaˌcauː] rift valley (60 feet (18 m) wide and 20 feet (6.1 m) deep) near Grindavík, which is promoted to tourists as marking the boundary between the Eurasian and North American tectonic plates. It was built in 2002 and previously named Leif the Lucky bridge in honor of Icelandic explorer Leif Eriksson who traveled from Europe to America nearly 500 years before Christopher Columbus.

A great deal of volcanic unrest was occurring in this part of the Reykjanes Peninsula from 2020 onward, after nearly 800 years of inactivity. After the eruption of the Fagradalsfjall volcano started on 19 March 2021, National Geographic's experts predicted that this "may mark the start of decades of volcanic activity". The eruption was small, leading to a prediction that this volcano was unlikely to threaten "any population centers". In November 2023, a new bout of seismic activity occurred around Grindavík, prompting the town's evacuation and the declaration of a state of emergency over the threat of an imminent volcanic eruption, culminating in the 2023–2025 Sundhnúkur eruptions.

== Reykjanes volcanic belt ==
Reykjanes volcanic belt
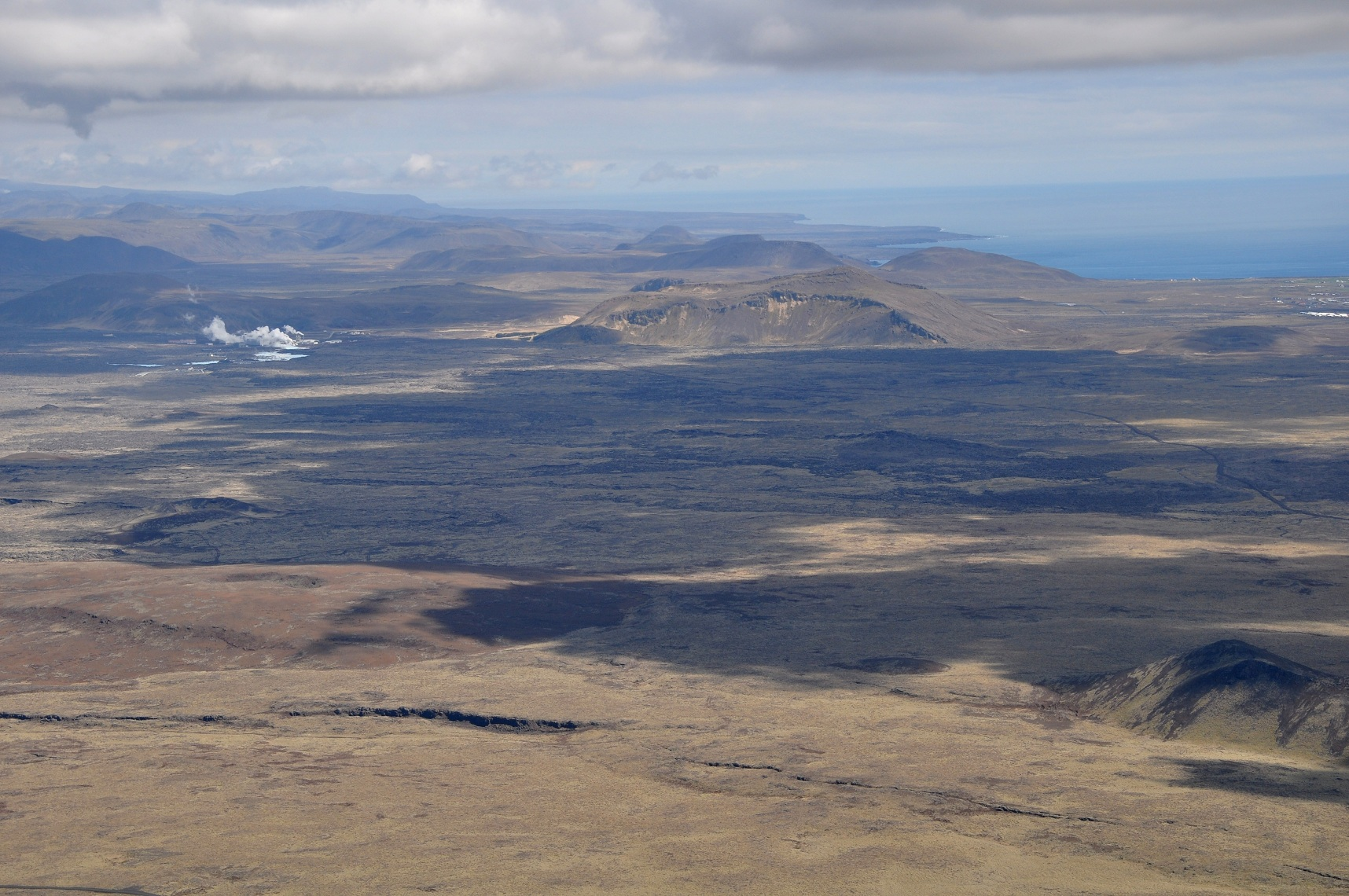
- The Reykjanes volcanic belt is almost completely covered by lava fields.

Highest point
- Coordinates: 63°52′18″N 22°33′48″W

Geography
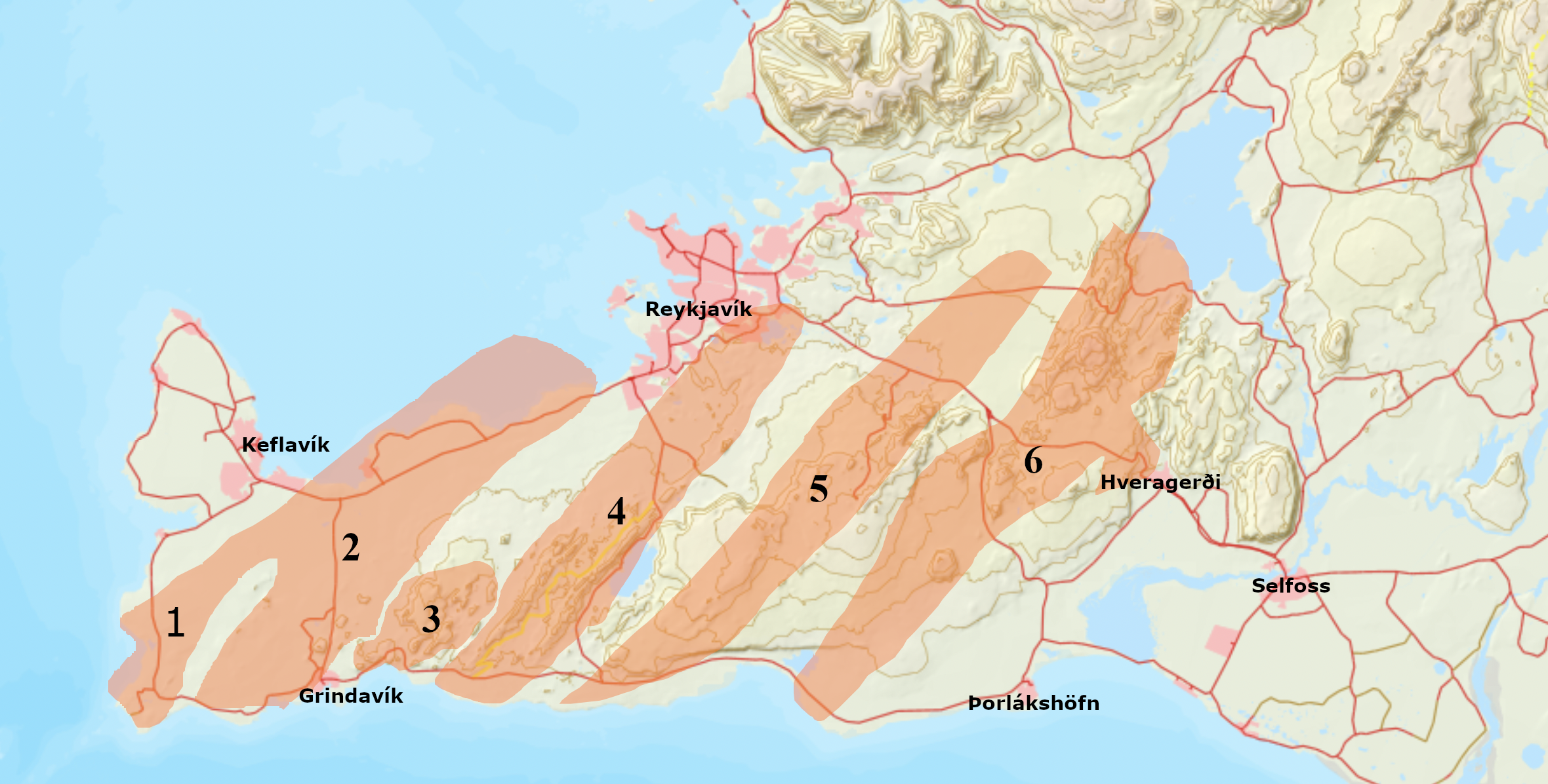
- Map of volcanic systems on the Reykjanes Peninsula. 1) Reykjanes, 2) Svartsengi, 3) Fagradalsfjall, 4) Krýsuvík, 5) Brennisteinsfjöll, and 6) Hengill
- Location: Reykjanes Peninsula, Iceland
- Parent range: Mid-Atlantic Ridge

Geology
- Mountain type: fissure
- Last eruption: 2023 CE

The Southern Peninisula contains the south western portion of the Reykjanes volcanic belt, where the continuation of the Mid-Atlantic Ridge and its submarine Reykjanes Ridge with the transitional Eldey volcanic system, rise above sea level. Depending on the author, the Reykjanes volcanic belt has between three and six volcanic systems; see map for six-system on land classification of the Reykjanes, Svartsengi, Fagradalsfjall, Krýsuvík, Brennisteinsfjöll (literal name Sulfur mountains), and Hengill volcanic systems. These are closely spaced en-echelon fissure systems, extending across the Reykjanes Peninsula.). Each volcanic system on the peninsula consists of (volcanic and tectonic) fissures and faults directed mostly NE-SW and may have other features such as lava fields and postglacial basaltic crater rows. Only the Hengill volcanic system, the most eastern system, has an additional central volcano, but this is outside the Southern Peninsula. Tephra deposits from offshore explosive Holocene eruptions have been preserved on the Reykjanes Peninsula.

=== Geothermal Energy ===
Geothermal energy in the Reykjanes Peninsula is a significant part of Iceland's energy landscape, rooted in the peninsula's unique geological setting as a trans-tensional plate boundary where the Mid-Atlantic Ridge comes onshore. This tectonic environment, characterized by segmented volcanic systems, creates favorable conditions for geothermal activity. Some areas of the Peninsula are home to temperatures of 100 degrees Celsius at 0.5 meters deep.

== Gallery ==
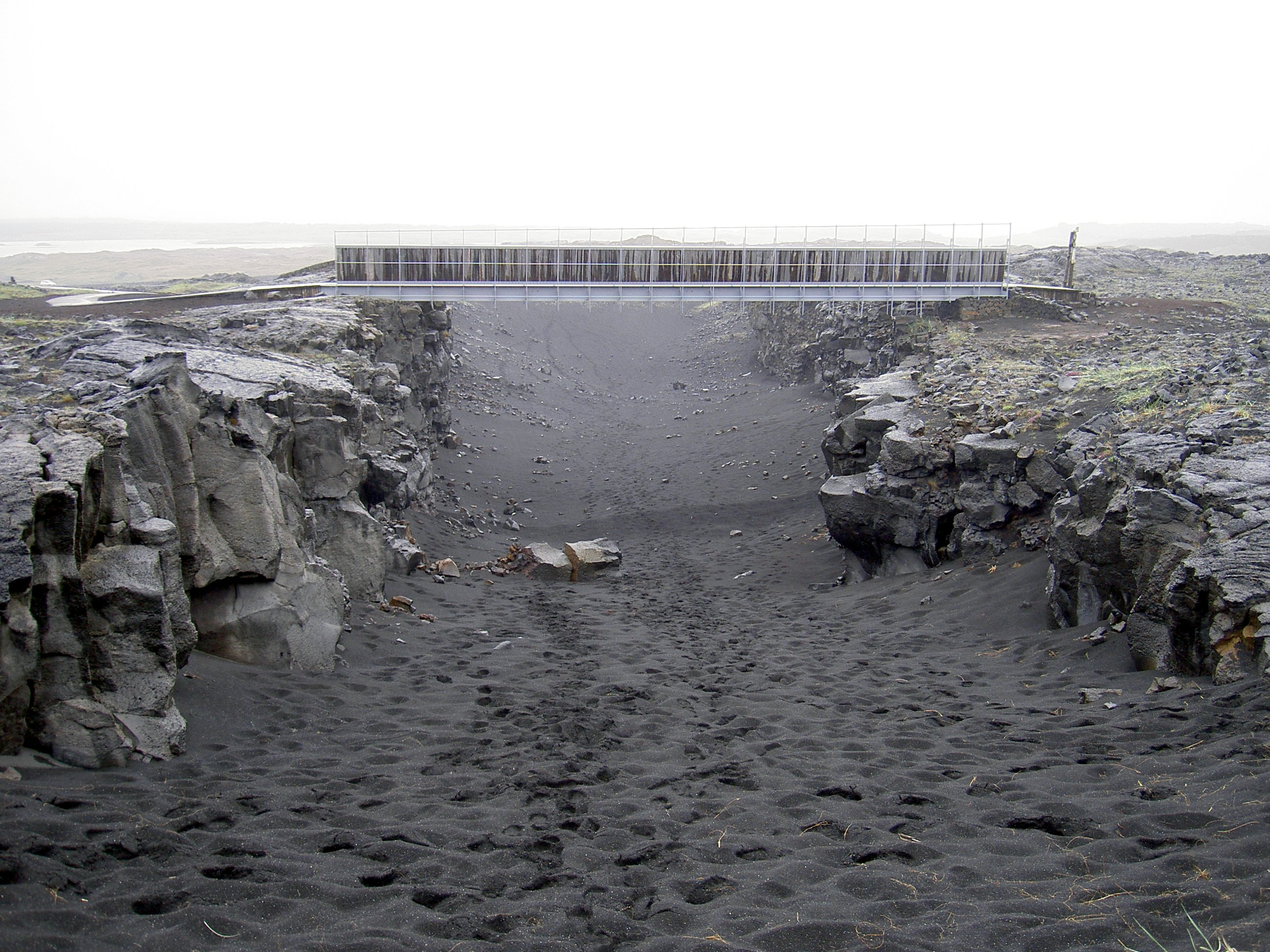
Leif the Lucky Bridge spanning the Álfagjá rift valley

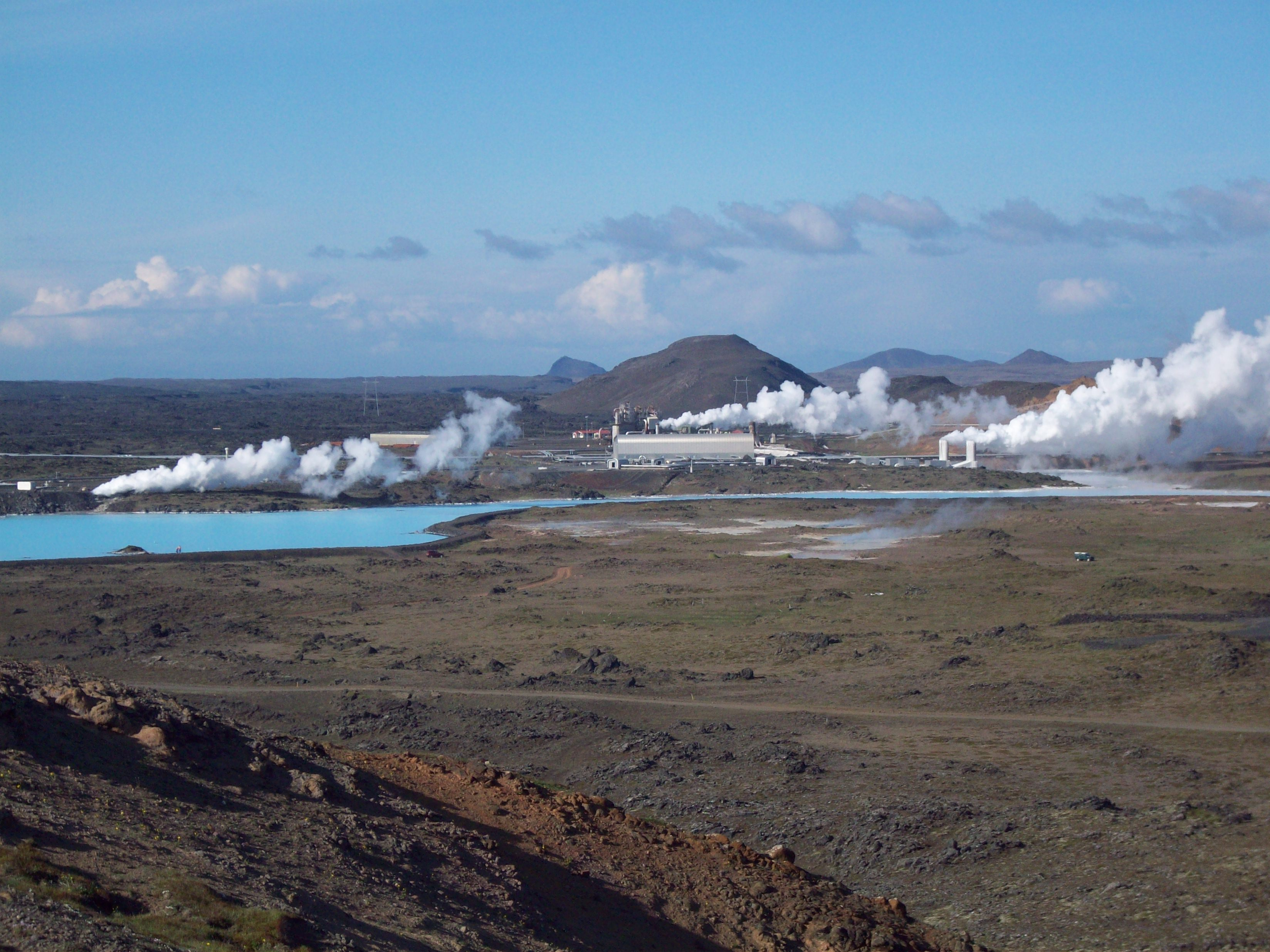
Reykjanesvirkjun geothermal power plant

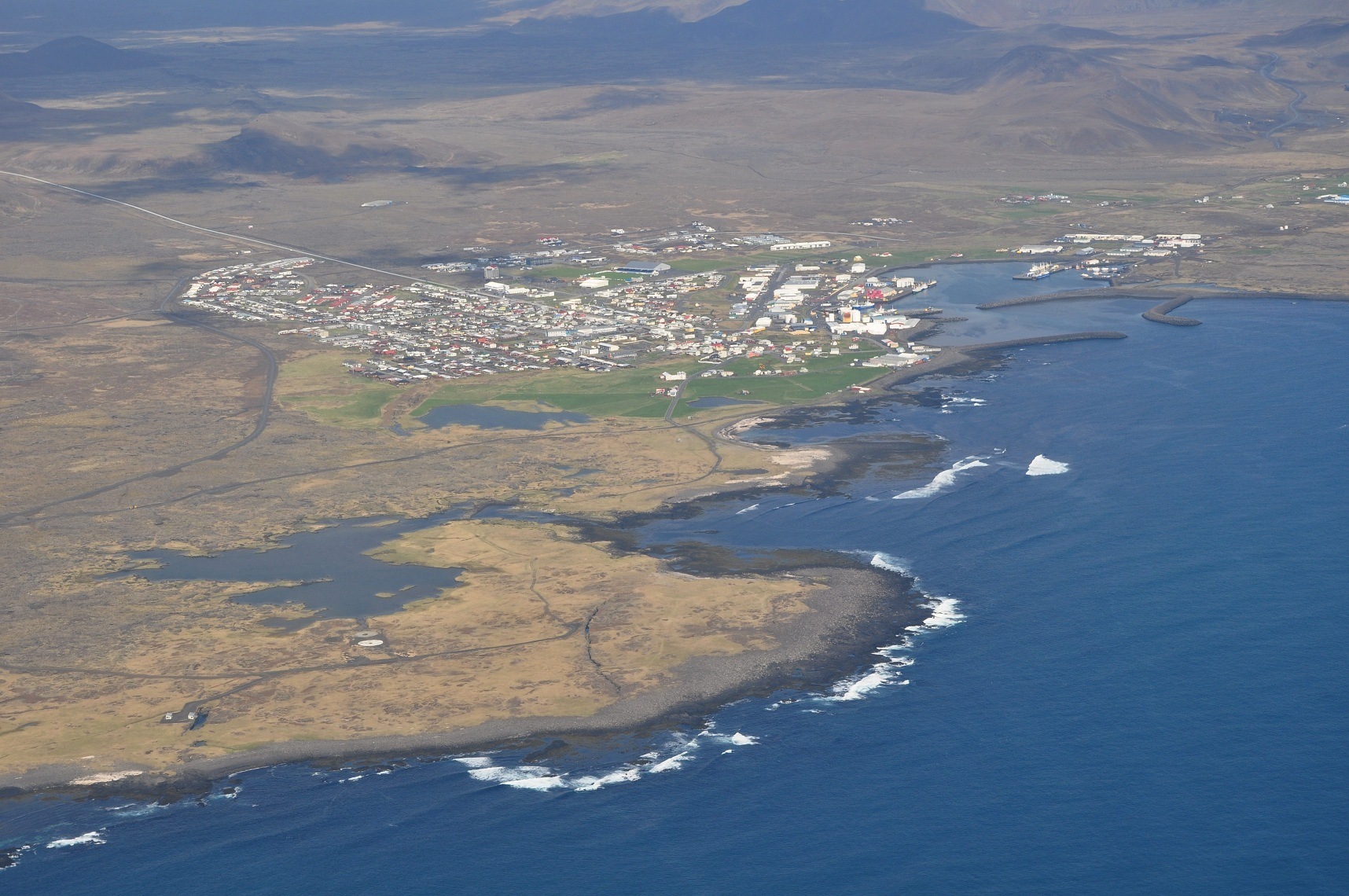
Grindavík

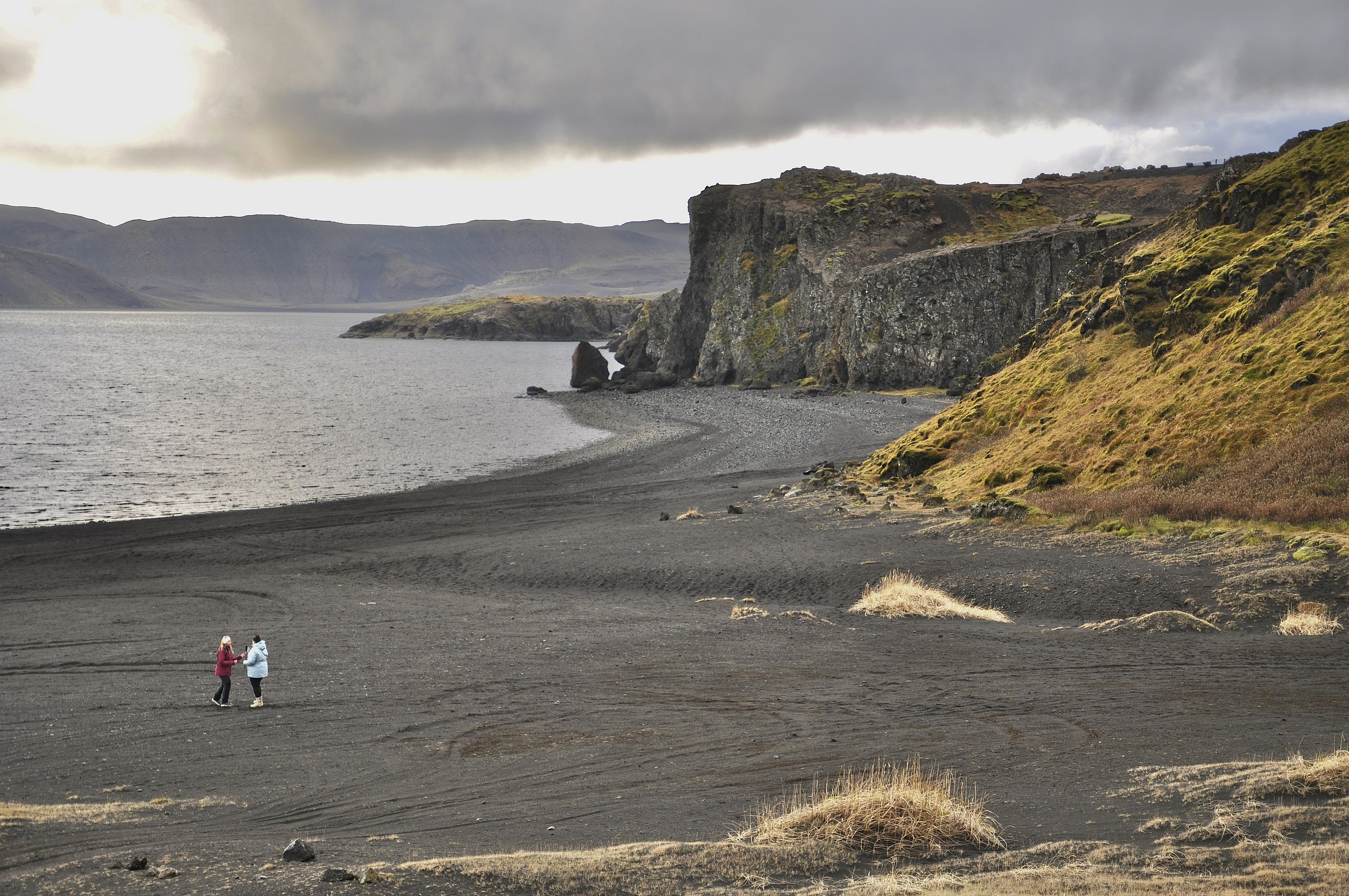
Black beaches of Lake Kleifarvatn

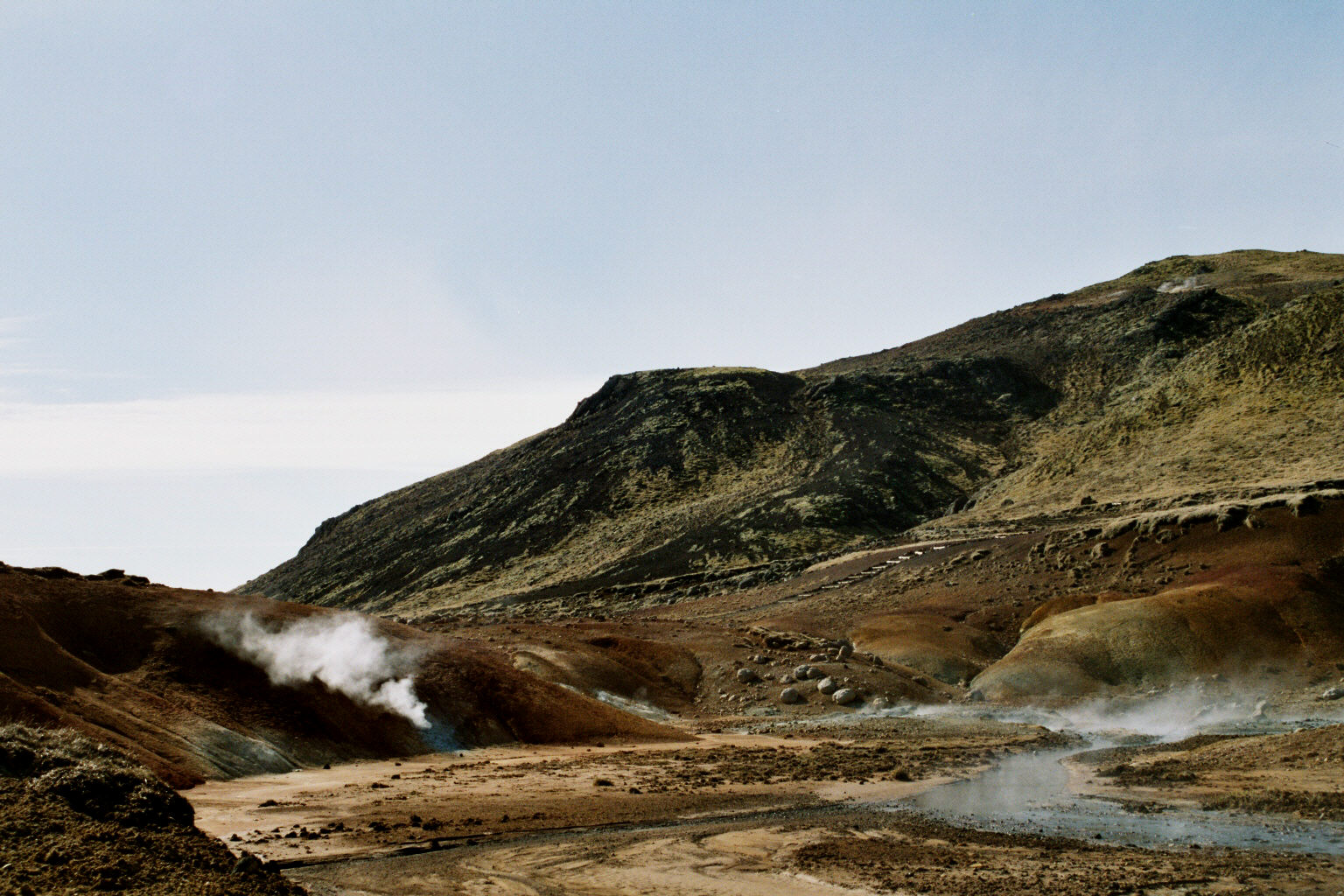
Krýsuvík

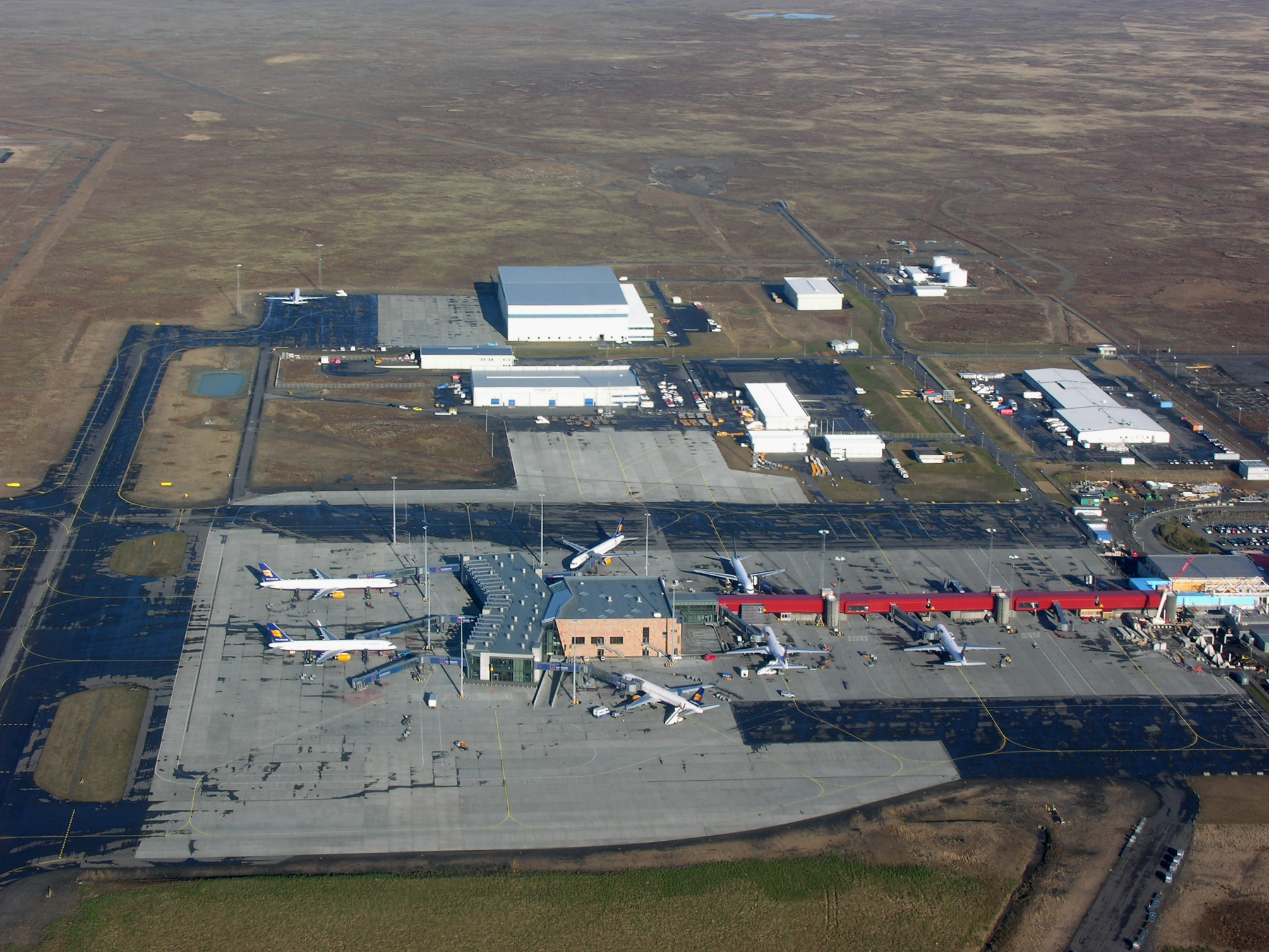
Keflavík International Airport

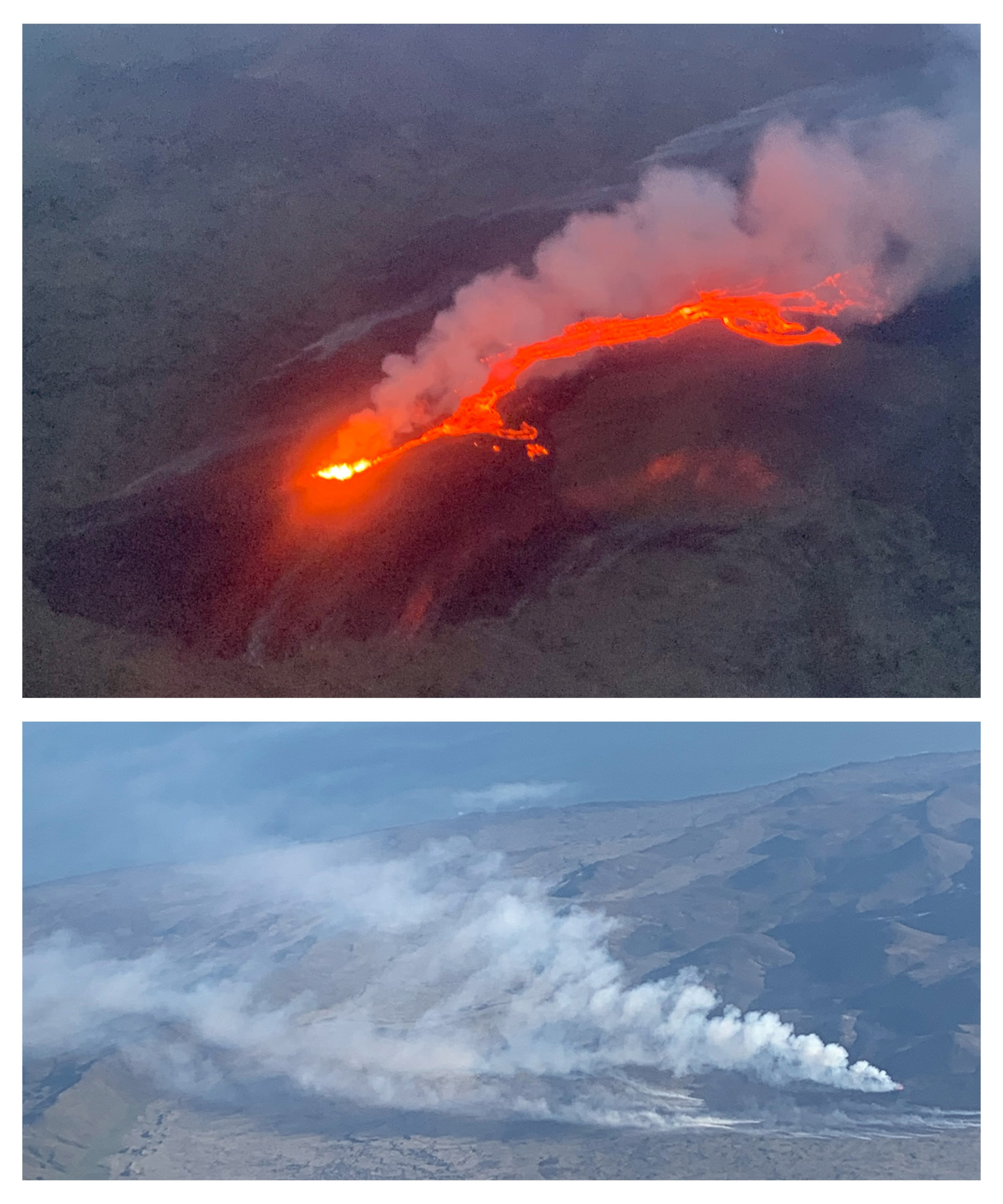
Litli-Hrútur eruption 2023. View from an airplane.

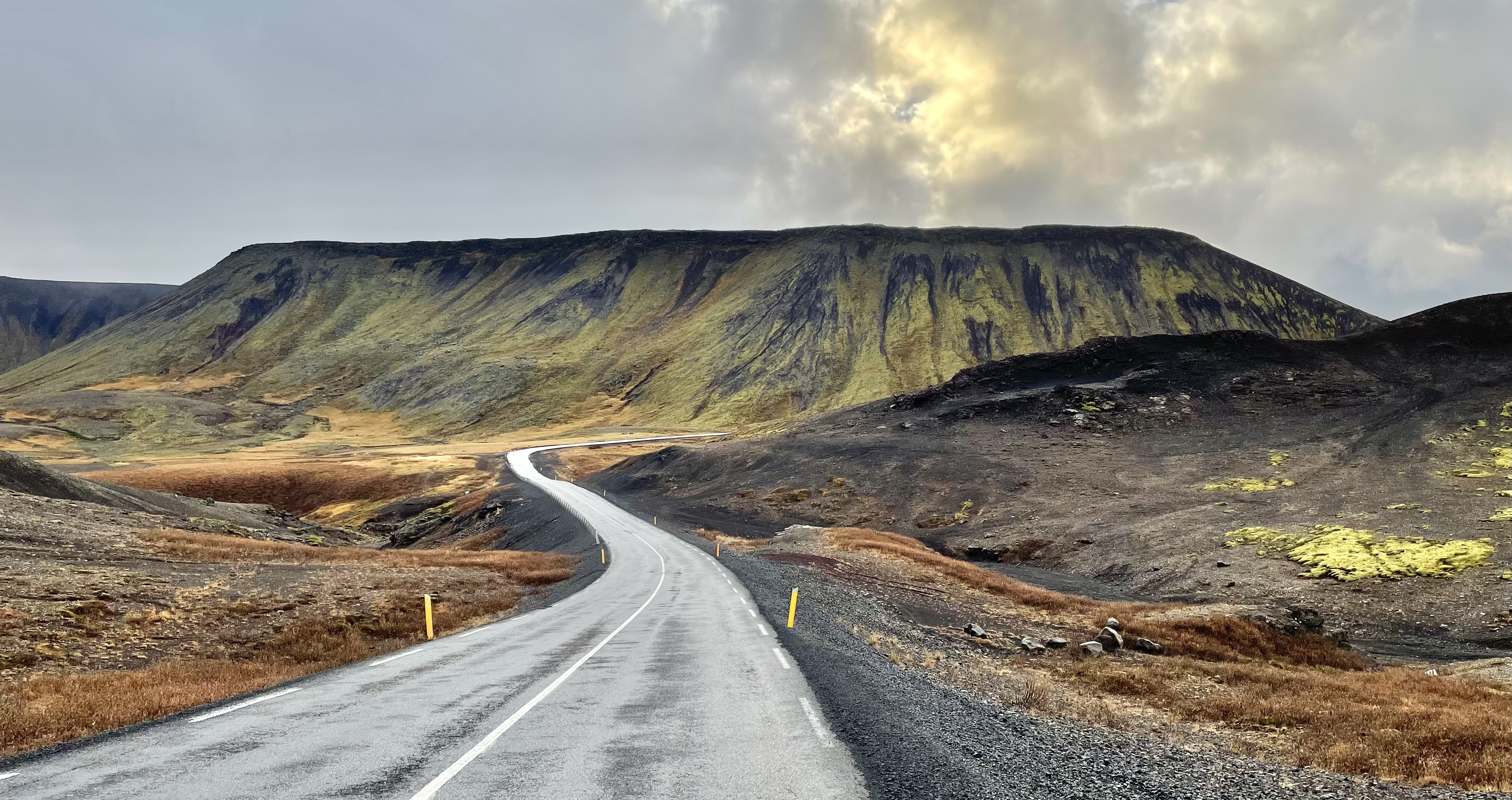
Road 42 approaching the Vatnshliðarhorn

== See also ==
- Krýsuvík (volcanic system)
- Brennisteinsfjöll (literal name Sulfur mountains)
