= Reykjanes =

Geographic feature in Southwestern Iceland

Reykjanes volcanic system
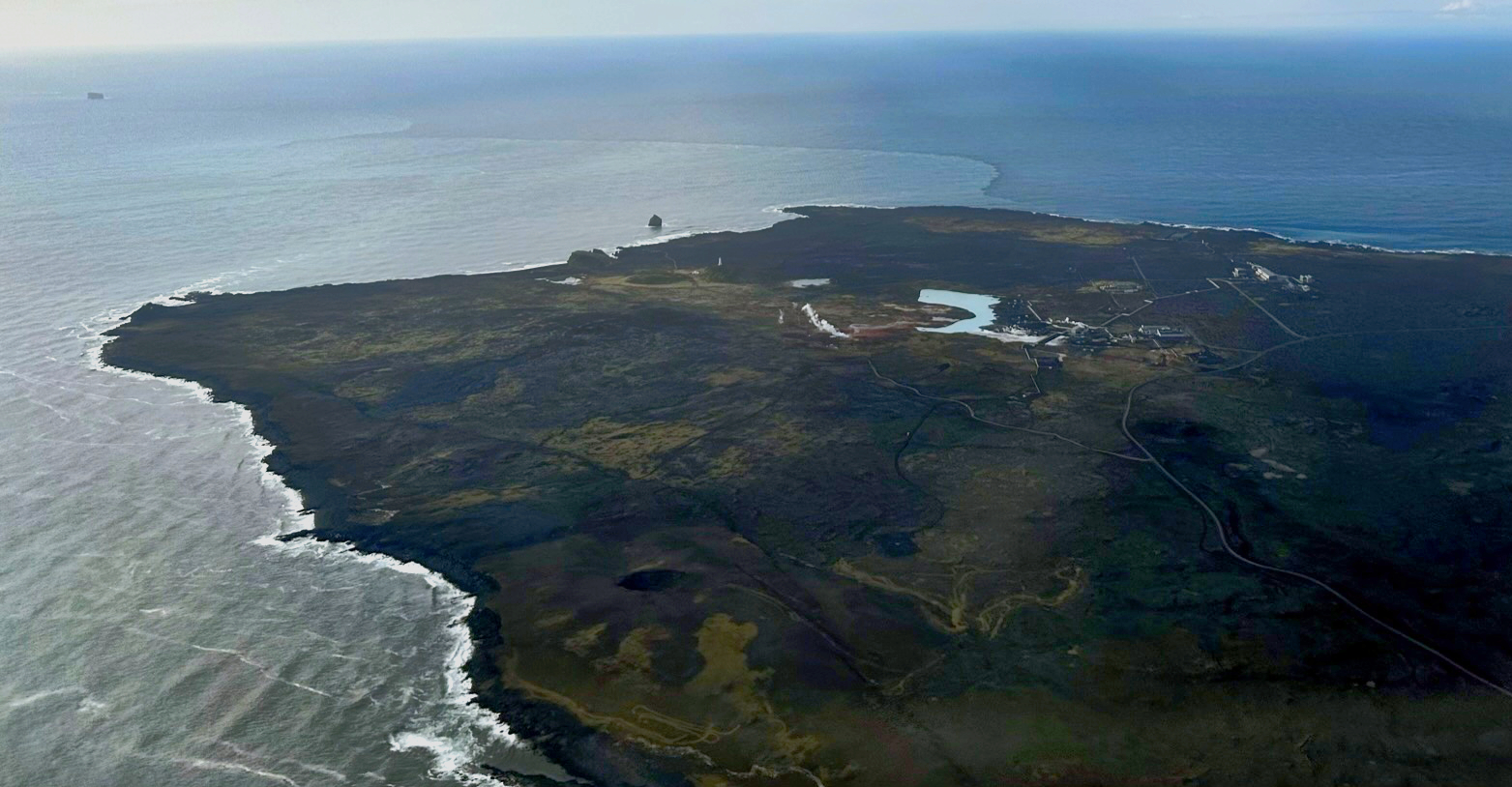
- Aerial view of Reykjanes, with Reykjanes Power Station towards centre of picture.

Highest point
- Elevation: 93 m (305 ft)
- Coordinates: 63°49′12″N 22°41′24″W

Dimensions
- Length: 45 km (28 mi)
- Width: 5–6 km (3.1–3.7 mi)
- Area: 25 km^{2} (9.7 sq mi)

Naming
- English translation: smoking point
- Language of name: Icelandic

Geography
- Location within Iceland
- Selected geological features near the Reykjanes volcanic system (approximate outline in red as part of system is ill defined). This is not the Reykjanes headland region which is smaller. Clicking on the image enables mouse-over with more detail where shading also shows: other fissure swarms, central volcanoes, calderas subglacial terrain above 1,100 m (3,600 ft), seismically active areas between 1995 to 2007.
- Location: Southern Peninsula, Iceland

Geology
- Mountain type: Volcanic system
- Last eruption: 1240 CE

Reykjanes (Icelandic pronunciation: [ˈreiːcaˌnɛːs]) is a small headland on the south-western end of the Reykjanes Peninsula in Iceland, giving the main peninsula its name. Volcanic action is responsible for forming the entire peninsula. The nearest town is Keflavik.

The name, Reykjanes, translates to "smoking point,” reykja 'smoking', and nes 'point'. It is named this due to the continuing volcanic activity of the Reykjanes volcanic belt; there are also many other uses of this name in Iceland, e.g. the Reykjanes Peninsula or Reykjanes in Ísafjarðardjúp.

== Geography ==
The region is about nine kilometres (5 1/2 miles) to the south of Iceland's international airport. It is about 25 km^{2} (9.7 sq mi) and includes the Reykjanes volcanic system that extends in a linear fashion up its centre continuing to the north-east as the hill of Sýrfell at 93 m (305 ft) high. Other volcanic systems of the Reykjanes volcanic belt could affect the Reykjanes region and have erupted as recently as April 2025. Other hills associated with the system are Skálafell (Grindavíkurbær) with a height of 76 m (249 ft) in the south-west near the sea and Bæjarfell at 69 m (226 ft) high to its north.

Valahnúkamöl is its south western cliff coast leading to Reykjanestá, the most south-western cape of the area.

=== Island Eldey ===
From the cliffs and beach at Reykjanestá, the island of Eldey can be seen. The distance to Reykjanestá is 14 km (8.7 mi), the height of the rocky island 77 m (253 ft). It is known to be especially popular with morus bassanus as a breeding place in the North Atlantic.

On the other hand, the Eldey Volcanic System, which is for the most part submarine, is today mostly seen as independent from Reykjanes Volcanic System. It is part of Reykjanes Ridge.

=== Lighthouse Reykjanesviti ===
In 1878, the first Icelandic lighthouse was erected near Valahnúkur. It had become necessary as the most used shipping lane next to Iceland passed by this point and the sea can be dangerous here. The 14 km (8.7 mi) broad strait between the peninsula and the island of Eldey is often used by ships and at the same time heavy currents accompany the tides in both directions so that the area had a bad reputation which many shipwrecks confirm. In 1887, the hill where it stood, was eroded by earthquake action, so that the old lighthouse had to be taken down. The next lighthouse could not be constructed before 1908 and was then built up on the hill of Vatnafell [ˈvahtnaˌfɛtl̥] at about 1 km (0.6 mi) from the coast line where it stands till today in 73 m (240 ft) msl. The Reykjanesviti lighthouse is on Bæjarfell and is fairly frequently visited by tourists. The geothermal power station is inland from the lighthouse to its north-east, it was built in 2006 and produces 100 MW.

=== Filming location ===
Films which were produced in this landscape include Prince of Darkness (Myrkrahöfðinginn) (a 2000 film by the Icelandic director Hrafn Gunnlaugsson, filmed near the lighthouse) and Flags of Our Fathers (a 2006 film by Clint Eastwood filmed about 10 km (6.2 mi) away in and around the bays Litla-Sandvík [ˈlɪhtla-ˌsantˌviːk] and Stóra-Sandvík [ˈstouːra- santˌviːk]).

== Geology ==
The basaltic low relief lava shields of the Reykjanes volcanic system are typically more than 4500 years old, but towards the south there are more recent eruptive fissures, with crater rows, tindars and hyaloclastite hills as well as parts of tuff cones near the south-west shoreline. The offshore volcanoes have produced 15 different tephra layers in the region. The volcano erupted for a 30 odd year period ending in 1240 CE. In 1226 CE an explosive eruption off Reykjanes produced about 0.1 km^{3} (0.024 cu mi) of tephra with deposits up to 100 km (60 mi) away. It also has lava dated to 2150 years ago and 3200 years ago. The Reykjanes volcano has been classified historically with the active as of 2024 Eldvörp–Svartsengi volcano to its south-east as its rift system intersects this to the east in the Reykjanes volcanic belt and the two volcanic systems are very similar, even though they have separate geothermal systems, and lava composition. Recent studies tend to classify the Reykjanes volcanic system as a separate fissure volcano of the Reykjanes volcano belt. This volcanic system marks the transition from the mainly extensional structure of the underwater Reykjanes Ridge of the Atlantic mid-oceanic ridge to a trans-tensional plate boundary in the Reykjanes Peninsula. The 5–6 km (3–4 mi) wide Reykjanes volcanic system is in a rift zone, which extends 45 km (28 mi), including at least 9 km (5.6 mi) out to sea towards the Reykjanes Ridge. Volcanic rock production has kept pace with rift extension and subsidence with at least ten eruptions in the 14,500 years since the area became ice free after the end of the last ice age. Within the volcanic system there are active NE–SW dip-slip faults. There are two main fissure swarm zones being in the north (Stampar) and south (Sýrfell). They are separated by about 2 km (1.2 mi), and their western parts have been active in the last three eruptive periods of the Reykjanes area.

The volcanic rocks are basalts, with picrite, or tholeiite characteristics. While the active volcanism on the peninsula has been a major source for the geothermal activity in the area, there is evidence that the volcanism can fuel geothermal systems up to 30 kilometres (19 mi) away, as far as Hvalfjörður. On the Reykjanes Peninsula itself, the system has had its geothermal potential exploited, producing up to 176 MW of power.

Sometimes also the Stampar [ˈstam̥par̥] crater rows from eruptions during the 13th century within the Reykjanes Volcanic System are counted in as well as the high temperature area around the mud resp. hot water geysers of Gunnuhver [ˈkʏnːʏˌkʰvɛːr̥].

Most of the Reykjanes area is at risk of disruption from future eruptions and susceptibility maps have been published.

== Wildlife ==
Northern fulmar, European herring gull and Common raven are present along the south, east and part of the north coast of Reykjanes to the town of Vogar. Black-legged kittiwake is mostly bound to cliffs along the coastline of Reykjanestangi.

== See also ==
- Volcanism of Iceland
  - List of volcanic eruptions in Iceland
  - List of volcanoes in Iceland
Reykjanes' scenery

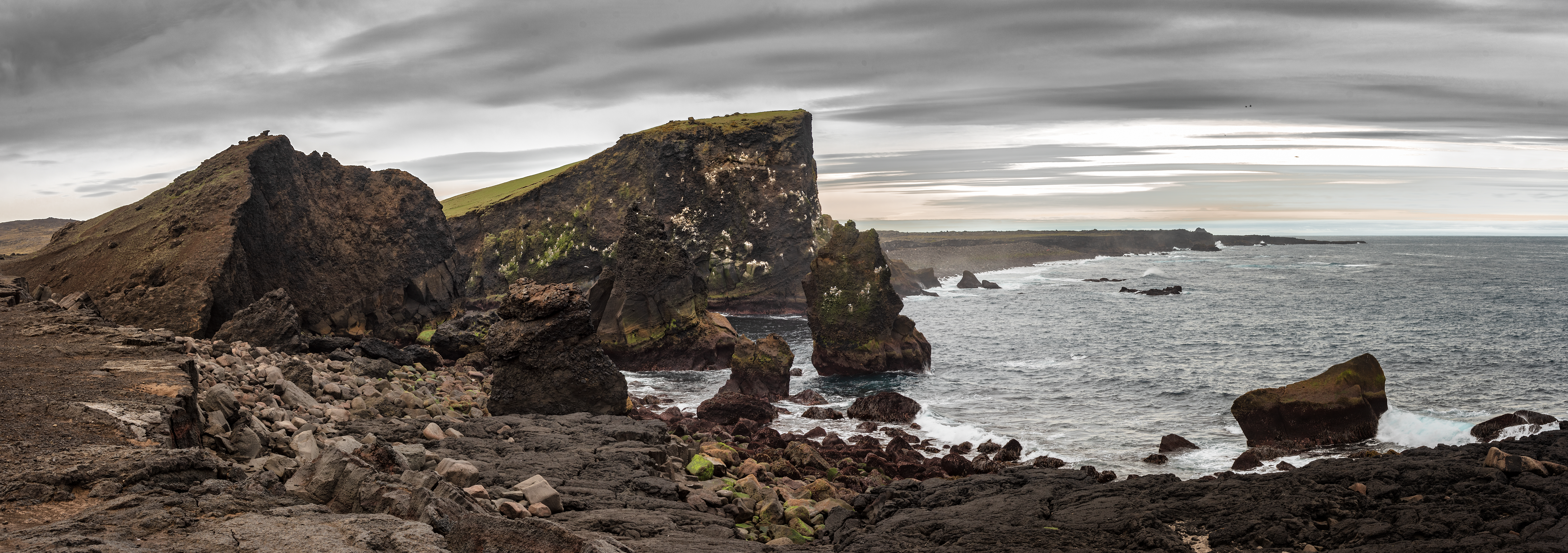
Valahnúkamöl coast to south towards Reykjanestá

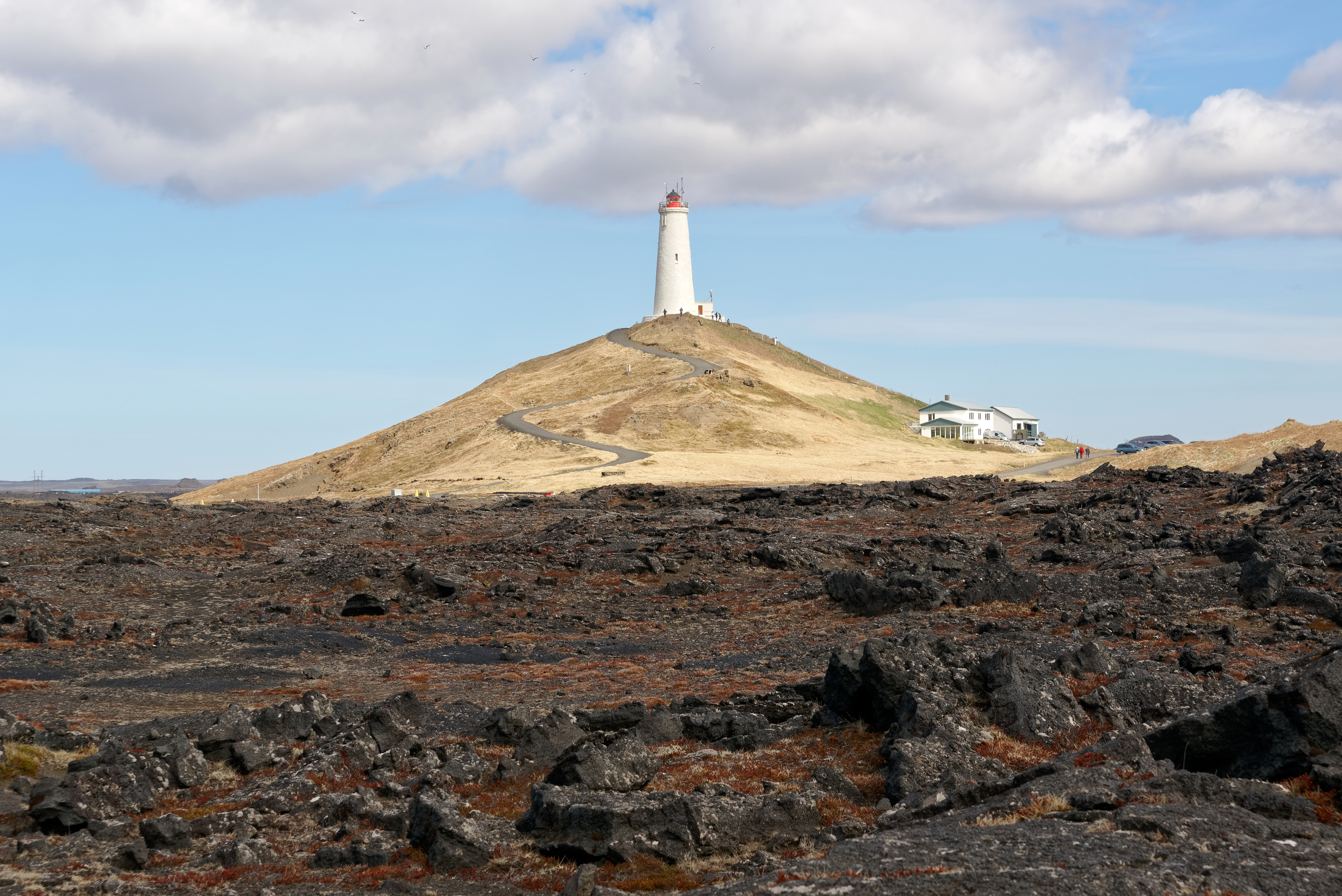
Reykjanesviti lighthouse on Bæjarfell with lighthouse keeper's residence

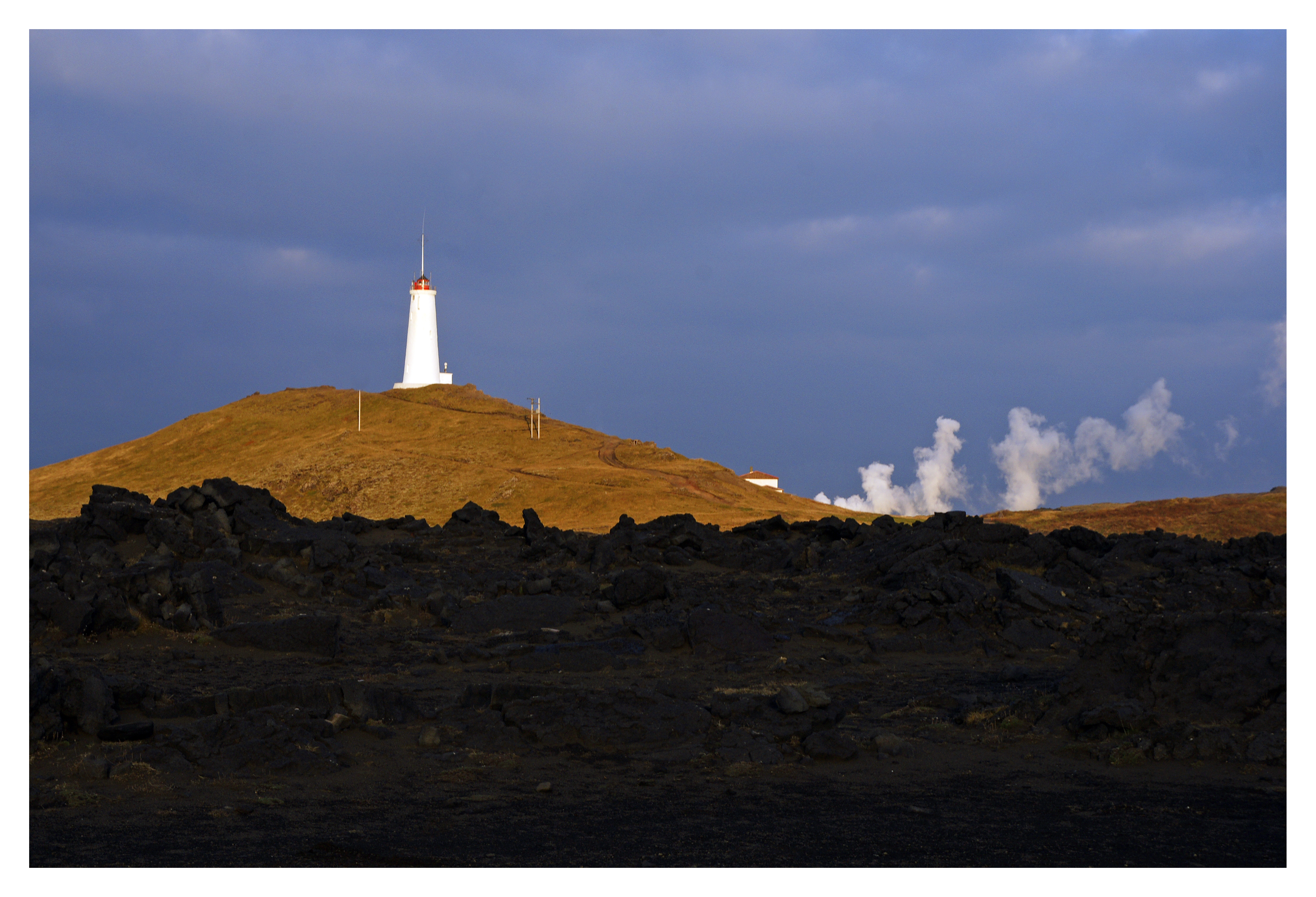
Reykjanesviti lighthouse with steam from the geothermal area of Gunnuhver

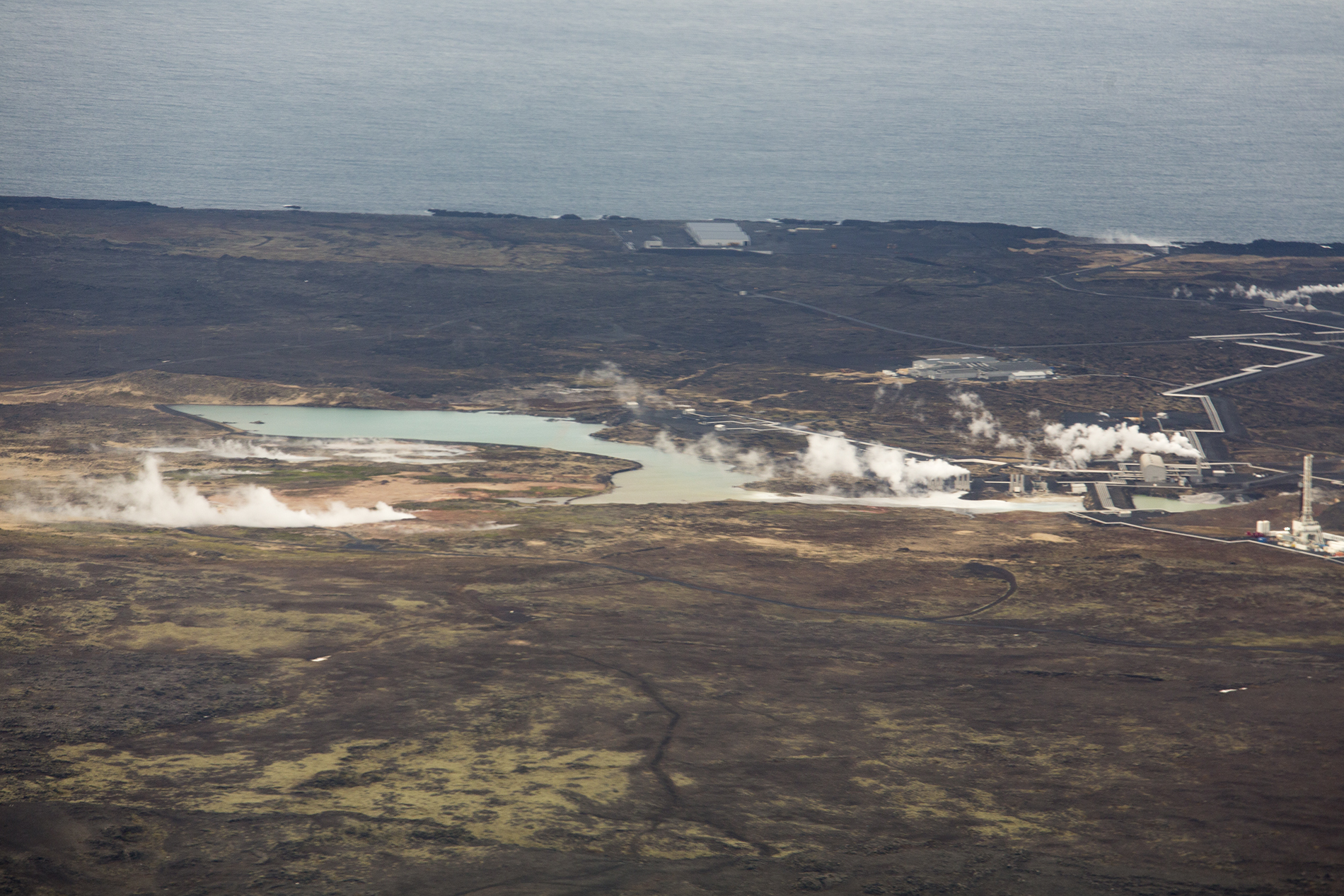
Suðurnesjavirkjun (Reykjanes Power Station) with cooling ponds

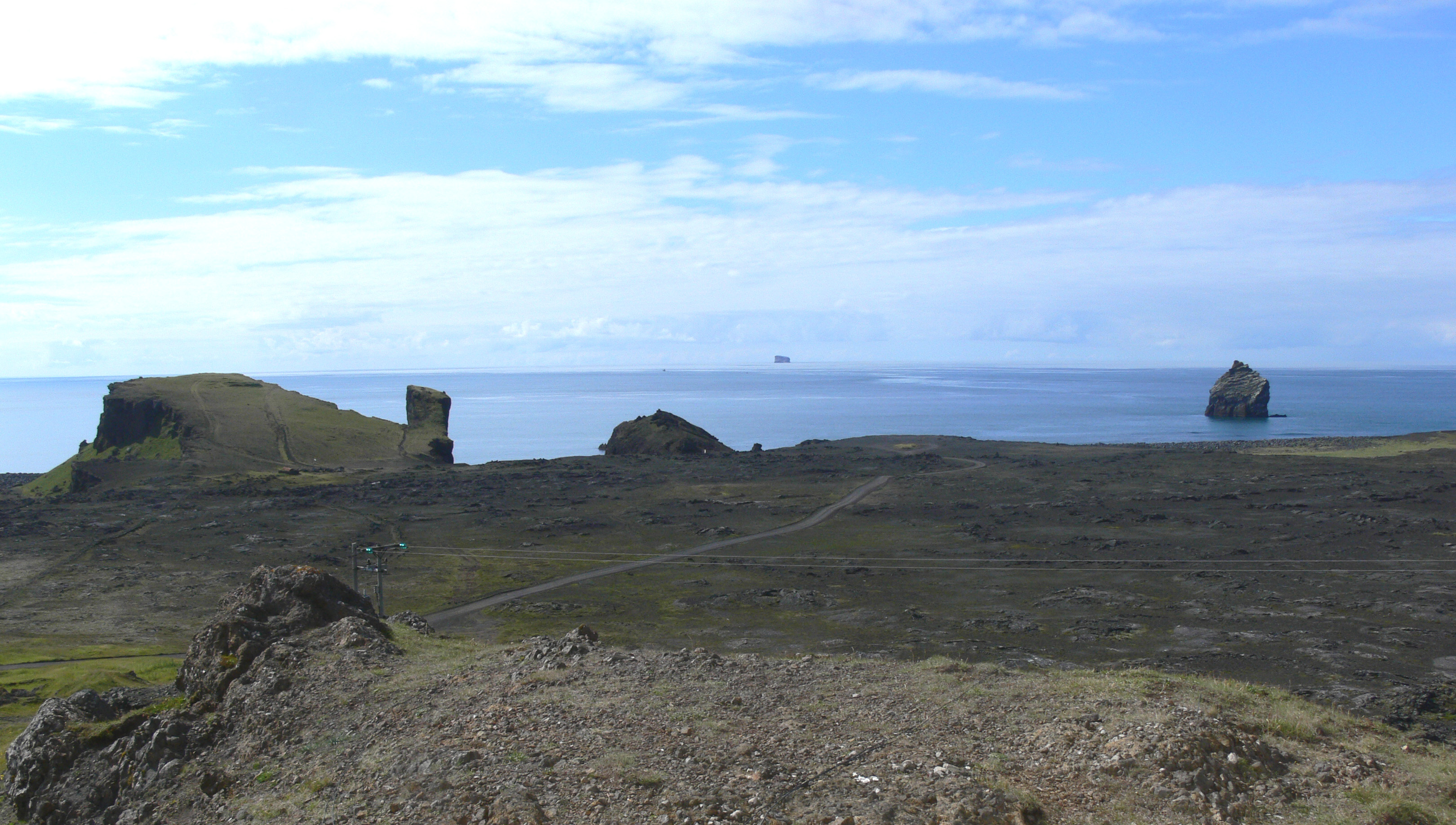
View from Reykjanestá to south-west with Eldey in the far background

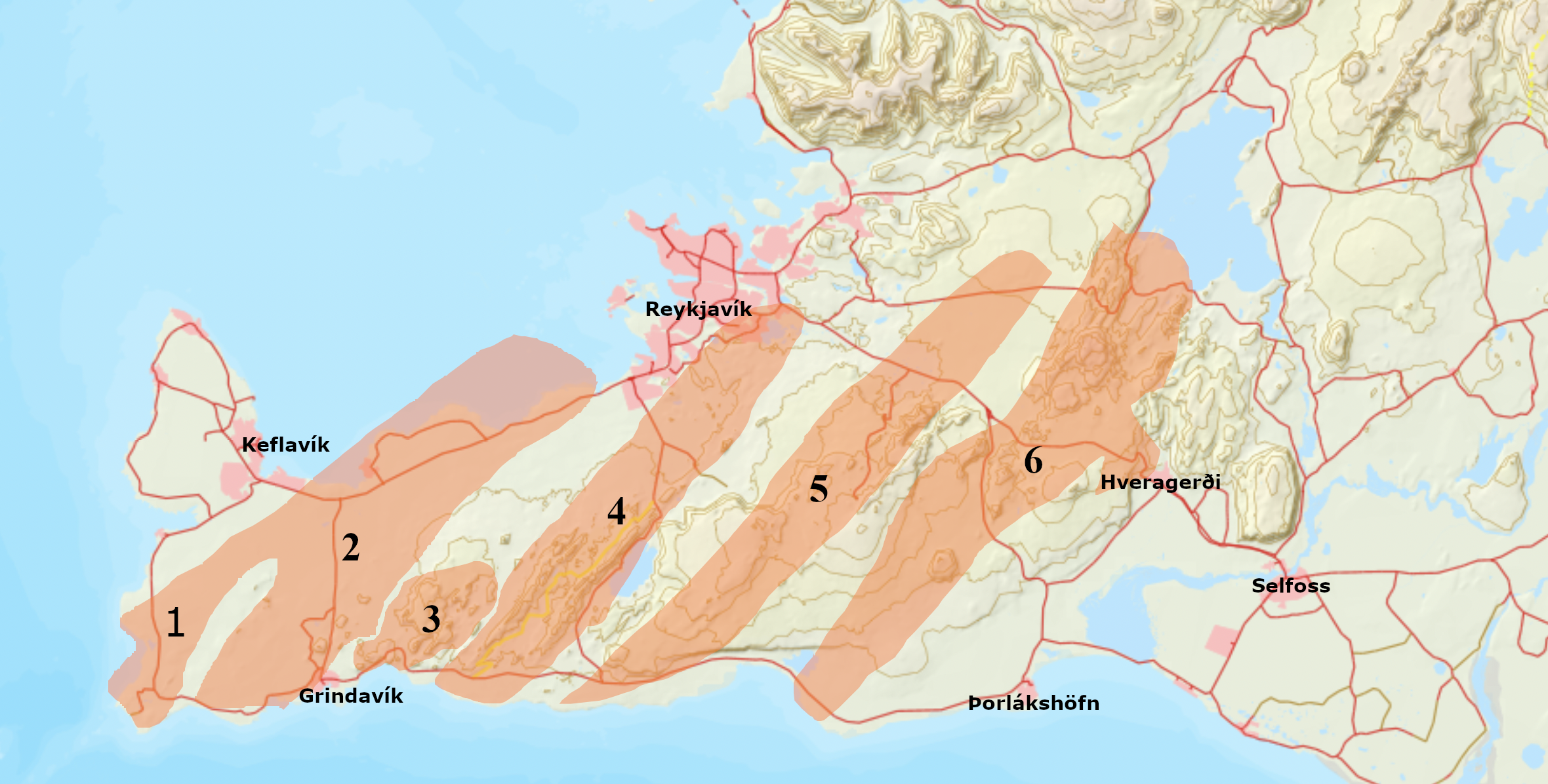
Map of volcanic systems on the Reykjanes Peninsula. The Reykjanes system is marked here as number 1
