= Settlement of Iceland =

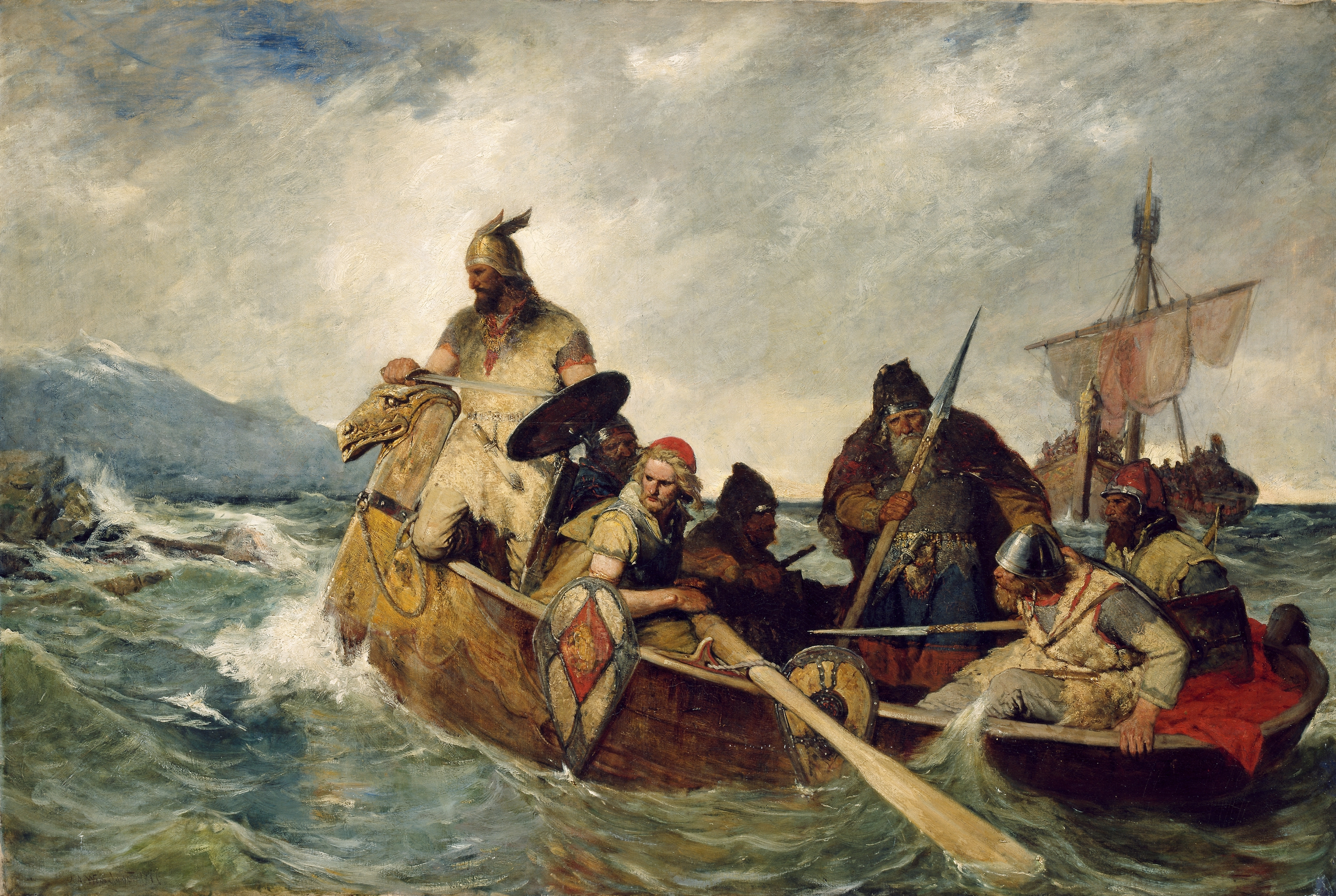
A speculative nineteenth-century depiction of Norsemen landing in Iceland in 872. In reality, they did not have winged helmets.

The settlement of Iceland is generally believed to have begun in the second half of the ninth century, when Norse settlers migrated across the North Atlantic. The reasons for the migration are uncertain: later in the Middle Ages Icelanders themselves tended to cite civil strife brought about by the ambitions of King Harald Fairhair of Norway, but modern historians focus on deeper factors, such as a shortage of arable land in Scandinavia. Unlike Great Britain and Ireland, Iceland was unsettled land and could be claimed without conflict with existing inhabitants.

On the basis of Íslendingabók by Ari Þorgilsson, and Landnámabók, histories dating from the twelfth and thirteenth centuries and providing a wealth of detail about the settlement, the years 870 and 874 have traditionally been considered the first years of settlement. However, these sources are largely unreliable in the details they provide about the settlement, and recent research focuses more heavily on archaeological and genetic evidence.

Traditionally, the Icelandic Age of Settlement is considered to have lasted from 874 to 930, at which point most of the island had been claimed and Alþingi (Althingi), the assembly of the Icelandic Commonwealth, was founded at Þingvellir (Thingvellir). Iceland is thus the second-to-last major land mass to be permanently settled by humans (Madagascar and New Zealand being colonized in the mid-first millennium and thirteenth century, respectively).

== History of settlement ==
=== Pre-870s settlement ===
According to one hypothesis, which is based on radiocarbon dating evidence from Vestmannaeyjar off the southern coast of Iceland, the island was first settled by Norsemen as early as the end of the sixth century or in the seventh century. The dated material was found under a layer of tephra (volcanic fragments), called the 'Settlement Layer', left by an eruption dated through ice core analysis to about 871. However, doubts have been raised about the accuracy of this dating because of the possible effect of volcanic carbon dioxide on the dating process. According to Magnús Stefánsson, the attribution of this material to a sixth-to-seventh-century settlement should be rejected.

Other archaeological sites have been found which predate the traditionally accepted date of 874 for the earliest settlement of the island. Some dwellings were excavated in Reykjavík in 1971–73 which were found below the 'Settlement Layer' and thus must date to before 870. A cabin in Hafnir was abandoned between 770 and 880 CE. It is thought to have been a hunting and fishing outpost only inhabited part of the year, but it is not known whether it was built by people from Scandinavia, Ireland or Scotland. Two longhouses built consecutively on the same site in Stöð near the village of Stöðvarfjörður in eastern Iceland have been excavated since 2015. The older of these is one of the largest longhouses ever found in Iceland and may date to as early as 800. Bjarni F. Einarsson, the head of the archaeological team which excavated the site, believes that the older longhouse was used as a summer outpost by Scandinavians. In archaeologist Orri Vésteinsson's view, there was probably a period of seasonal settlement of the island before permanent settlements were established.

The Íslendingabók of Ari Thorgilsson claims that the Norse settlers encountered Gaelic monks, called papar by the Norsemen, from a Hiberno-Scottish mission when they arrived in Iceland. There is some archaeological evidence for a monastic settlement from Ireland at Kverkarhellir cave, on the Seljaland farm in southern Iceland. Sediment deposits indicate people lived there around 800, and crosses consistent with the Hiberno-Scottish style were carved in the wall of a nearby cave. Ari Thorgilsson writes that the monks left upon the arrival of the Norsemen since they did not want to live with non-Christians.

The oldest known source which mentions the name "Iceland" is an eleventh-century rune carving from Gotland. There is a possible early mention of Iceland in the book De mensura orbis terrae by the Irish monk Dicuil, dating to 825. Dicuil claimed to have met some monks who had lived on the island of Thule. They said that darkness reigned during winter but that the summers were bright enough to pick lice from one's clothing, but the veracity of this source may be questioned. Additionally, Iceland is only about 450 kilometres from the Faroes, which had been visited by Irish monks in the sixth century, and settled by the Norse around 650.

=== Norse settlement ===
Written sources consider the age of settlement in Iceland to have begun with settlement by Ingólfr Arnarson around 874, for he was the first to sail to Iceland with the purpose of settling the land. Archaeological evidence shows that extensive human settlement of the island indeed began at this time, and "that the whole country was occupied within a couple of decades towards the end of the ninth century." Estimates of the number of people who migrated to the country during the Age of Settlement range between 4,300 and 24,000, with estimates of the number of initial settlers ranging between 311 and 436.

While the written sources emphasise settlement from Norway, genetic evidence shows that the founder population of Iceland came from Ireland, Scotland, and Scandinavia: studies of mitochondrial DNA and Y-chromosomes indicate that 62% of Icelanders' matrilineal ancestry derives from Scotland and Ireland (with most of the rest being from Scandinavia), while 75% of their patrilineal ancestry derives from Scandinavia (with most of the rest being from the Irish and British Isles). Archaeogenetic evidence suggests that the actual founding population included a higher proportion again of settlers from the Irish and British Isles: one study found that the mean Norse ancestry among Iceland's settlers was 56%, whereas in the current population the figure was 70%. It is thought likely that most of the settlers from Ireland and Scotland came as slaves, and therefore reproduced less successfully than higher-status settlers from Scandinavia, making them ancestors of a smaller proportion of the modern population.

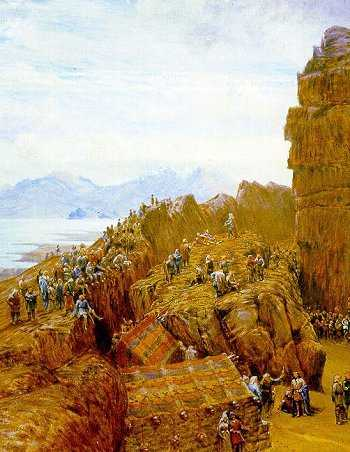
19th century painting showing a romanticised view of 11th century Alþingi session

Though the notion that population pressure drove migration to Iceland remains unsupported in the academic literature, a number of reasons have been offered for the settlement of Iceland:

1. Available land would have been attractive to Viking Age Scandinavians, especially given the relatively warm climate in Iceland at the time.
2. The observation of valuable resources, such as walrus ivory, made Iceland attractive to those looking to profit on trade.
3. Greater resistance to Viking incursions in the British isles and continental Europe in the late ninth century pushed Vikings to seek more peaceful opportunities.
4. Medieval written sources emphasize how Harald Fairhair's centralization of Norway and imposition of burdensome taxes on farmers encouraged farmers to migrate to Iceland.

Written sources say some settlers took land freely, others bought lands from earlier settlers, some were gifted land by earlier settlers, and that some settlers took lands from others through the use of force or threat of force. Lands were likely not rented during the Age of settlement. Medievalist Hans Kuhn argued that lands were given away or taken freely because earlier settlers had no need for such extensive lands. Historian Gunnar Karlsson notes that it could be rational for earlier settlers to encourage new settlers to settle lands nearby so as to ease maintenance of cattle and slaves, and as insurance in times of crisis.

=== Age of settlement ends ===
Ari Thorgilsson claims in Íslendingabók that the country had been "fully settled" by 930. Correspondingly, Landnámabók suggests that within about sixty years, all the usable land had been taken; it mentions 1,500 farm and place names, and more than 3,500 people, arranged in a geographical fashion.

In the periodisation of Icelandic history, therefore, the age of settlement is considered to have ended in the year 930 with the establishment of Alþingi; at this point the Icelandic Commonwealth period is considered to begin. Archeological evidence shows, however, "that immigrants continued to arrive in Iceland throughout the 10th century". The authors of one study speculate that "continued immigration may have been needed to sustain the population".

== Theories ==
=== Naddoddr and Garðar ===
Travels of the first Scandinavians in Iceland during the ninth century

Landnámabók claims that the first Norseman to rest his feet on Icelandic soil was a viking by the name of Naddoddr. Naddoddr stayed for only a short period of time, but gave the country a name: Snæland (Land of Snow). He was followed by the viking explorer Garðar Svavarsson, who was the first to stay over winter. At some time around 860, a storm pushed his ship far to the north until he reached the eastern coast of Iceland. Garðar approached the island from the east, sailed westward along the coast and then up north, building a house in Húsavík. He completed a full circle, circumnavigating the island and establishing that the landmass in question was indeed an island. He departed the following summer, never to return but not before giving the island a new name – Garðarshólmur (literally, Garðar's Island). One of his men, Náttfari, decided to stay behind with two slaves. Náttfari settled in what is now known as Náttfaravík, close to Skjálfandi. Landnámabók maintains that Náttfari was not a permanent settler.

=== Hrafna-Flóki ===
The next Norseman to arrive in Iceland was named Flóki Vilgerðarson, but the year of his arrival is not clear. According to the story told in Landnámabók, he took three ravens to help him find his way. Thus, he was nicknamed Raven-Flóki (Icelandic: Hrafna-Flóki). Flóki set his ravens free near the Faroe Islands. The first raven flew back to the Faroes. The second flew up in the air and then returned to the ship. However, the third flew in front of the ship and they followed its direction to Iceland.

He landed in Vatnsfjörður in the Westfjords after passing what is now Reykjavík. One of his men, Faxi, remarked that they seemed to have found great land—the bay facing Reykjavík is therefore known as Faxaflói. A harsh winter caused all of Flóki's cattle to die—he cursed this cold country, and when he spotted a drift ice in the fjord he decided to name it "Ísland" (Iceland). Despite difficulties in finding food, he and his men stayed another year, this time in Borgarfjörður, but they headed back to Norway the following summer. Flóki would return much later and settle in what is now known as Flókadalur.

=== Ingólfur Arnarson ===
It is said with accuracy that a Norwegian called Ingólfr travelled from there [Norway] to Iceland for the first time when Haraldr the Fine-Haired was sixteen years old, and a second time a few years later; he settled in the south in Reykjarvík.

— Íslendingabók

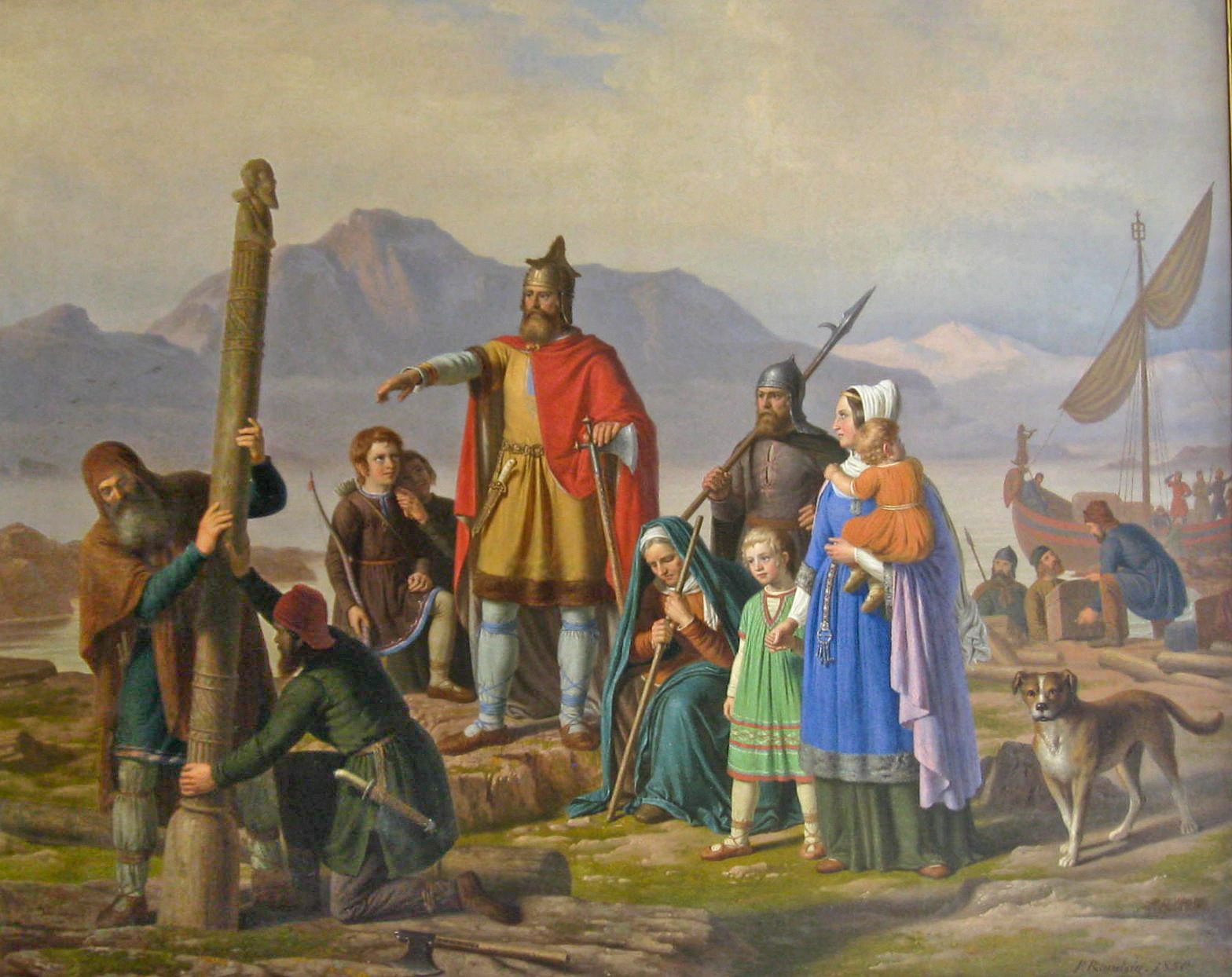
Ingólfur commands his high-seat pillars to be erected

Another Norseman, by the name of Ingólfur Arnarson, had instigated a blood feud in his homeland, Norway. He and his foster-brother Hjörleifr Hróðmarsson went on an exploratory expedition to Iceland, and stayed over winter in what is now Álftafjörður. A few years later they returned to settle the land with their men. When they approached the island, Ingólfur cast his high seat pillars overboard and swore that he would settle where they drifted to shore. He then sent his slaves Vífill and Karli to search for the pillars.

In the meantime, Hjörleifr had been murdered by his Irish slaves. Ingólfr hunted them down and killed them in the Westman Islands. The islands got their name from that event, with westmen (Old Norse: vestmenn) being a name that the Norsemen used for the Irish. Ingólfr was said to have settled a large part of southwestern Iceland, although after his settlement nothing more was known of him. His son, Þorsteinn Ingólfsson, was a major chieftain and was said to have founded the Kjalarnesþing, the first thing, or parliament, in Iceland. It was a forerunner of the Althingi.

As winter approached, Ingólfur's slaves found the pillars by Arnarhvoll. When summer came, he built a farmstead in Reykjavík and claimed all the land west of the rivers of Ölfusá, Öxará and Brynjudalsá. His slave Karli did not care for the location, and said to Ingólfur: "How ill that we should pass good land, to settle in this remote peninsula."

== Change in Viking mentality ==
As aforementioned, many Vikings adapted to an agrarian lifestyle after settling in Iceland. This meant, for the most part, an abandonment of their raiding practices. This in turn led to a shift in Viking mentality towards a community minded society using alternative methods of conflict resolution, rather than just manslaughter.

Viking Iceland’s self-governing nature led to an emphasis on individual integrity. Sources say this may be due in part to ideas of land ownership, but stated that the aspect of self-government led to a cohesive cultural identity and bond. Medievalist Jesse L. Byock notes that while there were feuds, they consistently showed restraint in that few reached beyond the point of a vendetta. Scholars theorize this is because long-term feuding affected participation in social culture, leading to isolation for those feuding in the winter months, which would have negative psychological affects. As Iceland itself is small and isolated, the individualistic “us against them” mentality didn’t last long, and gave way to less violent forms of vendetta. This is a major shift in contrast to the raiding and pillaging going on in the rest of the Viking World and sets Viking-age Iceland apart from other Norse settlements.

== Environmental effects ==
Prior to the deforestation of Iceland in the Middle Ages, some 40% of the land was forested. Today, the country is about 2% forested, with the Icelandic Forest Service aiming to increase that share to 10% through reforestation and natural regrowth. Scholars have argued that the settlers caused soil erosion through extensive deforestation and overgrazing. One study suggests that the primary motive for the deforestation was "clearance for pastures and home-fields", not the "settlers' requirements for fuel and building material".

== See also ==
- History of Iceland
- Timeline of Icelandic history
- Viking expansion
- Pre-modern human migration
