= Kollafjörður (Faxaflói) =

Fjord in southwestern Iceland

Coordinates: 64°11′30″N 21°53′00″W

Map of Reykjavik and the surrounding area

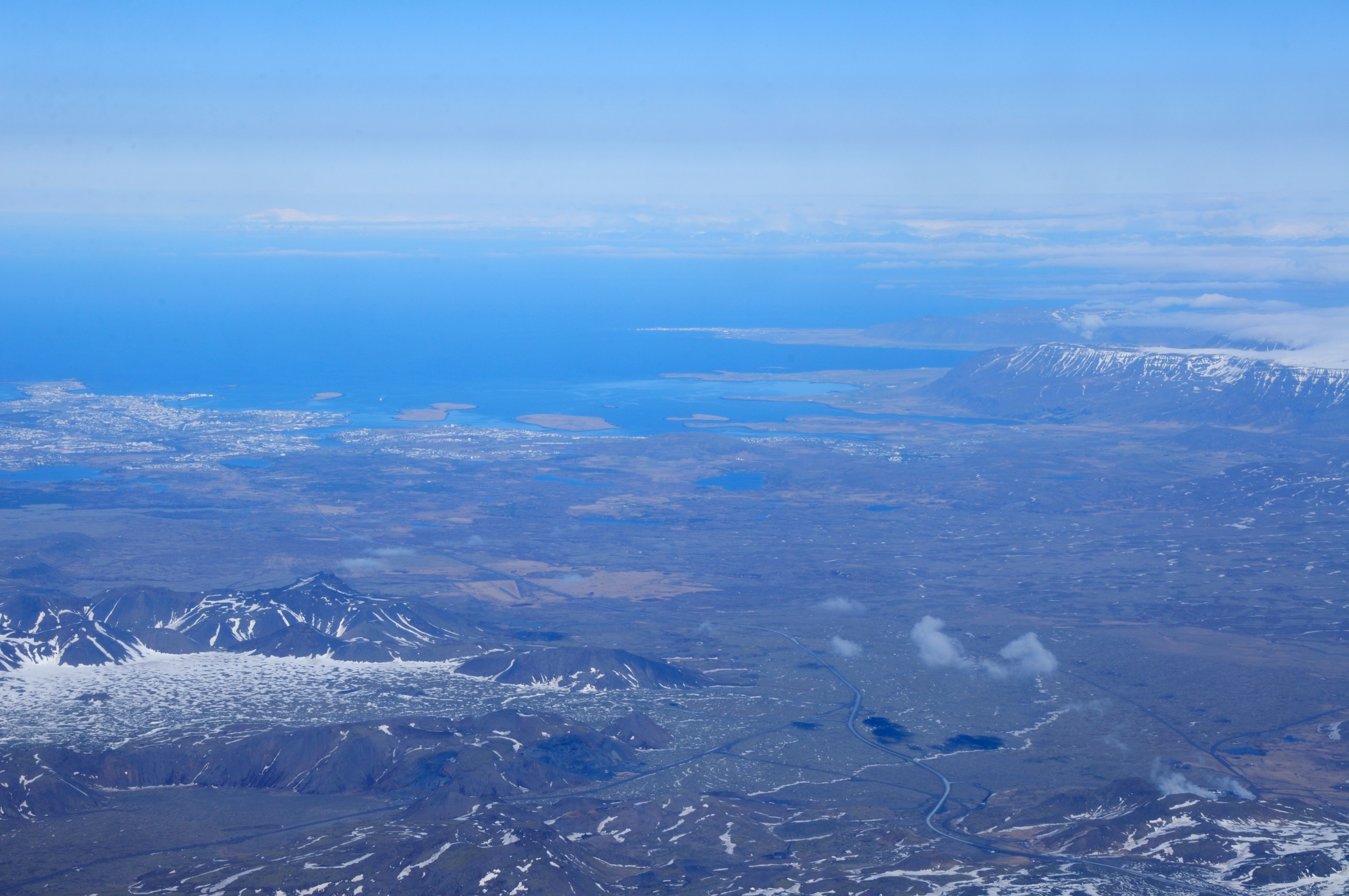
Kollafjörður to the right, below Esja

Kollafjörður (literally "mountaintop fjord") is a fjord that flows from the southeastern side of Faxaflói (Faxi Bay). It spans from Kjalarnes peninsula at the mouth of Hvalfjörður all the way to Seltjarnarnes, with Skerjafjörður just to the south.

== Geography ==
There are several large islands in Kollafjörður (Akurey, Engey, Viðey, Þerney, and Lundey), most of which were inhabited at various points. On the northern side of the fjord is Kjalarnes peninsula and the mountain Esja. On the eastern side are the mountains Mosfell and Reykjafell, as well as the municipality of Mosfellsbær, and Leirvogur bay. On the southern side of the fjord are Elliðavogur, Reykjavík, and Seltjarnarnes.

There are three municipalities with land bordering Kollafjörður: Reykjavík, Mosfellsbær, and Seltjarnarnes.
