= Puffin Island =

Puffin Island may refer to the following islands:

== Canada ==
- Puffin Island (Baccalieu Tickle), Newfoundland and Labrador
- Puffin Island (Greenspond), Newfoundland and Labrador

== Iceland ==
From the Icelandic word for puffin:

- Lundey, Faxaflói
- Lundey, Skagafjörður
- Lundey, Skjálfandi

== Ireland ==
- Puffin Island (County Kerry)

== United Kingdom ==
- Puffin Island (Anglesey), Wales
- Lundy (from puffin in Old Norse), in the Bristol Channel

== United States ==
- Puffin Island (Alaska)
- Puffin Island (Washington), in the San Juan Islands

== See also ==
- Puffin Island virus
- Puffin (disambiguation)
