= Hrafna-Flóki Vilgerðarson =

Viking explorer

A map indicating the travels of the first Scandinavians in Iceland during the 9th century

Hrafna-Flóki Vilgerðarsson (Old Norse: [ˈhrɑvnɑ-ˌfloːke ˈwilˌɡerðɑz̠ˌson]; Modern Icelandic: [ˈr̥apna-ˌflouːcɪ ˈvɪlˌcɛrðarˌsɔːn]; born 9th century) was a Norseman who intentionally sailed to Iceland. His story is documented in the Landnámabók manuscript; however, the precise year of his arrival is not clear. He was of Norwegian origin.

== Voyage to Iceland ==
In 868, Flóki left to search for the land found by Garðar Svavarsson way up in the north. He was accompanied by his family on his journey; his wife was named Gró and his children included Oddleifur and Thjódgerdur. From Western Norway he set sail to the Shetland Islands where it is said his daughter drowned. He continued his journey and landed in the Faroe Islands where another of his daughters was wed. There he took three ravens to help him find his way to Iceland, and thus, he was nicknamed Raven-Flóki (Old Norse and Icelandic: Hrafna-Flóki) and he is commonly remembered by that name.

Others making the trip included Thorolf (Þórólfr) and two men named Herjolf and Faxe (Herjólfr and Faxi). After sailing for a while from the Faroes, Flóki set the ravens free. The first raven flew back to the Faroes; later, the second flew up in the air and back on board, but the third flew northwest and did not return. Flóki now knew they were close to land, and so they followed the third raven. After sailing west past Reykjanes, they spotted a large bay. Faxe remarked that they seemed to have found great land. The bay facing Reykjavík was therefore known as Faxaflói (lit. 'Faxe's bay').

Flóki set up a winter camp in Vatnsfjörður at Barðaströnd. The summer was very good, so Flóki was ill-prepared for the cold winter that followed. Waiting for the spring, Flóki hiked up the highest mountain above his camp, now believed to be Nónfell in Westfjords. From there, he spotted a large fjord; Ísafjörður, then full of drift ice. Thus, he named the entire land Ísland (Iceland). When Flóki and the other men returned to Norway, they were asked about the newly found land. Flóki believed it to be worthless. Herjolf believed that the land had both good and bad qualities. Thorolf claimed that butter was smeared on every straw on the land that they had found. Thorolf was then nicknamed Thorolf Butter (Þórólfur smjör). Despite speaking ill of the land, Flóki later returned and settled to live there to his death.

== In fiction ==
Floki the boat builder, a character played by Swedish actor Gustaf Skarsgård in the History channel's Vikings television series, is loosely based on Hrafna-Flóki Vilgerðarson. In season 5 of the show he arrives in Iceland, believing he has found Asgard.

== See also ==
- Settlement of Iceland
- Timeline of Icelandic history
- Naddoddur — the first Scandinavian to discover Iceland, though accidental
- Garðar Svavarsson — second, also accidental
