= Svavarsson =

Svavarsson is a surname of Icelandic origin, meaning son of Svavar. In Icelandic names, the name is not strictly a surname, but a patronymic. The name may refer to:

- Gardar Svavarsson (fl. 9th century), Swedish man, said to be the first Scandinavian to live in Iceland
- Jörundur Svavarsson (contemporary), Icelandic professor of biology at the University of Iceland
- Vignir Svavarsson (born 1980), Icelandic handball player
