= Engeyjarætt =

Noted family in Engey, Iceland

The Engeyjarætt (Engey family) goes back to a married couple who lived in Engey in Kollafjörður in the first half of the 19th century, Ólöf Snorradóttir (1783–1844), who was born and raised in the island, and Pétur Guðmundsson (1786–1852), who was born in Örfirisey and raised there and in Skildinganes. They had eight children who survived childhood and had a large number of descendants, most of whom settled in Seltjarnarnes and in the Vesturbær district of Reykjavík. (In fact, as of 2011 it was reckoned that most of their nearly five thousand descendants still lived in the capital area.) Only one of their children moved from the area, Guðríður (1812–1889), who became priest's wife in the east of the country and has a number of descendants there and in Húnaþing.

== Well known Icelanders of the Engeyjarætt ==
- Bjarni Benediktsson (born 1908), former prime minister, from the Independence Party
- Bjarni Benediktsson (born 1970), former prime minister and leader of the Independence Party
- Björn Bjarnason, justice minister
- Halldór Blöndal, samgönguráðherra
- Valgerður Bjarnadóttir, parliamentarian of the Samfylking and wife of Vilmundur Gylfason
- Ragnhildur Helgadóttir, parliamentarian

== See also ==
- History of Iceland
- Seltjarnarnes
- Vesturbær
- Kollafjörður
- Engey
