= Vaðlaheiðargöng =

Toll tunnel in the north of Iceland

Coordinates: 65.6931°N 18.0544°W

Vaðlaheiði Tunnel
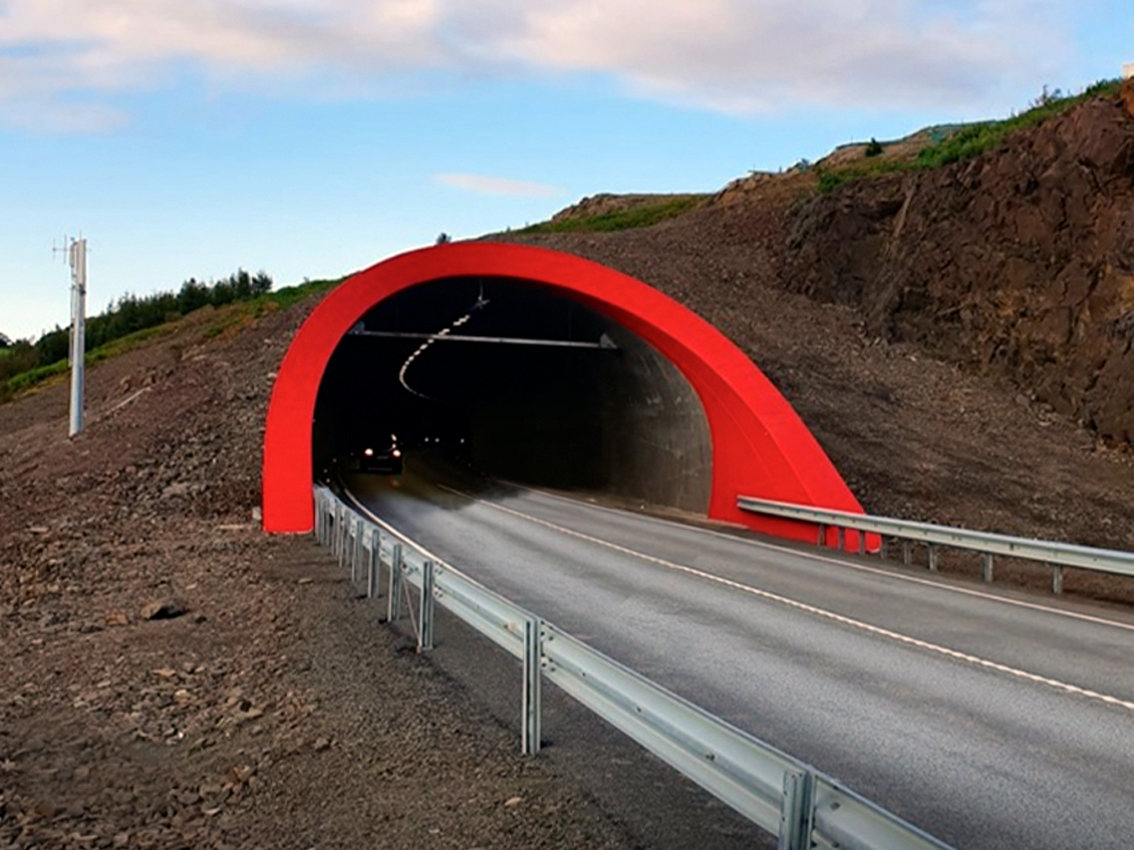
- Interactive map of Vaðlaheiði Tunnel

Overview
- Location: Eyjafjörður, Iceland
- Route: 1

Operation
- Work began: 12 July 2013
- Opened: 21 December 2018
- Traffic: Automotive
- Toll: 2,152 ISK
- Vehicles per day: 1,444 (2021)

Technical
- Length: 7.4 km (4.6 mi)
- No. of lanes: 2
- Operating speed: 70km/h
- Max elevation: 500m
- Min elevation: 60m
- Width: 9.5 m (31 ft)
- Grade: 1.5%

Vaðlaheiðargöng (Icelandic pronunciation: [ˈvaðlaˌheiːðarˌkœyŋk], lit. 'Vaðlaheiði Tunnel') is a toll tunnel in the north of Iceland along Route 1, just east of Akureyri. It passes between Eyjafjörður and Fnjóskadalur. It is 7.4 km (4.6 mi) long and replaces a 21 km section of Route 1 including the Víkurskarð pass, often closed during winter. The tunnel shortens the travel between Akureyri and Husavik by 16 km.

The tunnel's construction was delayed by two water ingress incidents, one being of geothermal hot water. Due to this, temperatures inside the tunnel rise up to 22-26 °C in the warmest sections, and one of the tunnel's emergency laybys has even been used for hot yoga. The hot water found is used in a local geothermal spa a few kilometres south of the tunnel.

== Construction and Cost ==
The estimated cost of the tunnel was ISK 11.5 billion (2013 prices, about US$96 million) but by April 2017, it was reported that the costs had surpassed the estimates by 44%. The Icelandic government loaned 4.7 billion ISK to the construction of the project in April 2017.

The tunnel was planned to open at the end of 2016. However, a large cold water leak was found in early 2015 and large supports needed to be put in place. Adding to the problems, a large volume of hot water was also found and needed to be pumped out of the tunnel. The tunnel was scheduled to open in the fall of 2018. As of April 2017, the tunnel had been drilled, but finishing up and building the road remained.

The tunnel opened on 21 December 2018.

== Water utilization ==
The two water ingresses encountered during the construction of the tunnel were contained and conduits were placed in the tunnel to its western entrance (Akureyri side). The hot water found in 2014 had a volumetric flow of 350L/s of 50 °C and around 500L/s of cold water was found separately in 2015. Initially the hot water was discharged into the sea just west of the tunnel, creating a small tourist attraction of its own, with locals bathing in the hot waterfall by the shore. The local utility, Norðurorka, plans to use the cold water for the local area, including Akureyri in future.

In 2017, a local competition was launched to find the best use of the hot water. After the utility connections had been constructed, in 2022 a geothermal spa called 'Forest Lagoon' opened, located a few kilometers south of the tunnel in Eyjarfjarðarsveit.

== Toll ==
The tunnel uses automatic number-plate recognition to collect tolls and is completely unmanned and has no toll collection booths. Users either register on their website and pay, or, after 24 hours the toll is invoiced to the owner through their vehicle registration plate, incurring a collection fee of 1,490 ISK. The tolls as of June 2025 are:

Single trip (one way)
Vehicle type	Weight range	Toll
Car	up to 3.5 tonnes	2,152 ISK
Medium Goods Vehicle	3.5 to 7.5 tonnes	2,968 ISK
Heavy Goods Vehicle	over 7.5 tonnes	6,255 ISK

Pre-paid trip (Cars only)
Number of trips	Price	Toll per trip
10 trips	15,370 ISK	1,530 ISK
50 trips	47,700 ISK	960 ISK

== Reception ==
The construction of the tunnel and the Icelandic government's role was somewhat controversial. Opponents of the project said the project would not be profitable within a reasonable span of time (if at all), the construction costs would exceed original estimates and the motivation behind the construction would be to benefit the voting demographic in the marginal constituency in which it was located.

Initially, the collection fee was 1,000 ISK if the toll was not paid within three hours. This was controversial as tourists and non-regular users were unaware of the system, and was later reduced to 400 ISK and grace period increased to 24 hours. As of June 2025, the collection fee is 1,490 ISK.

In July 2019, it was reported that the toll tunnel had earned 35-40% less than estimated. This was because fewer cars went through the tunnel than expected and because more drivers paid in advance than was expected.
