= Engey =

Icelandic island near Reykjavík

Coordinates: 64.171°N 21.913°W

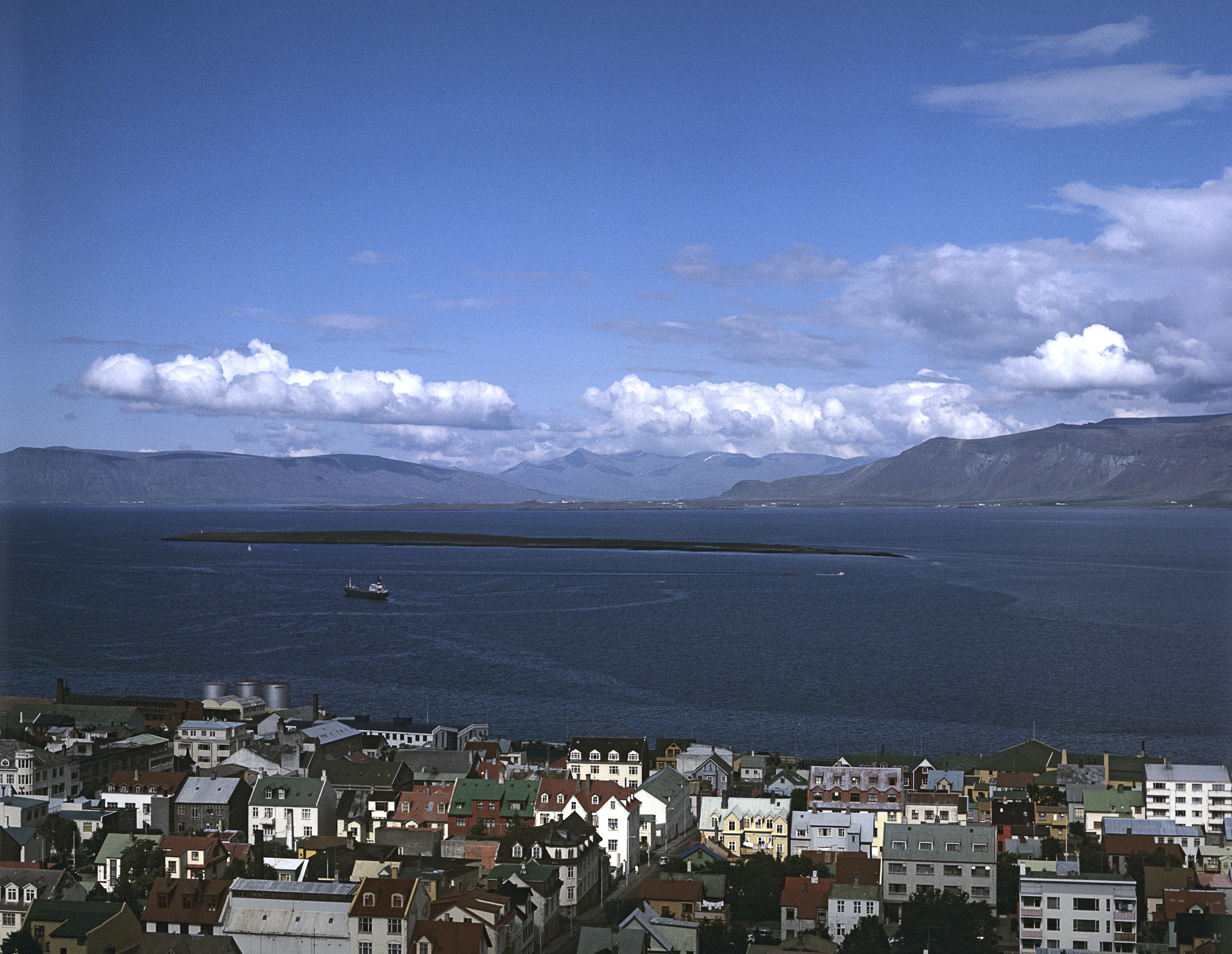
- Etymology: "Eng" (meadow) + "ey" (island)

Geography
- Location: Faxaflói
- Adjacent to: Viðey, Akurey
- Area: 0.4 km^{2} (0.15 sq mi)
- Length: 1,500 m (4900 ft)
- Width: 400 m (1300 ft)

Administration
- Iceland

Demographics
- Population: 0 (1950)

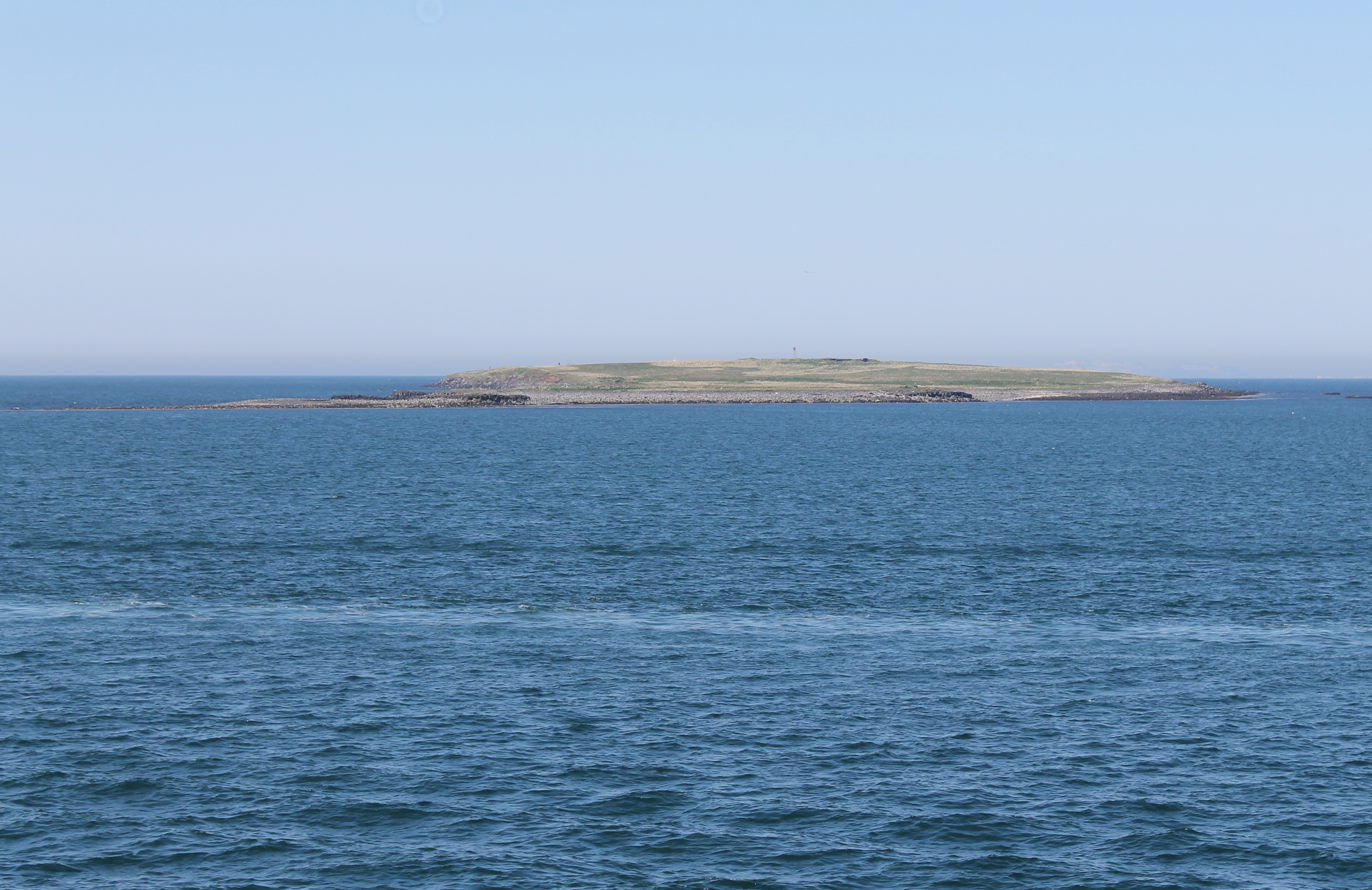
Engey, pictured in June 2012

Engey (Icelandic pronunciation: [ˈeiŋkˌeiː]) is the second largest island of the Kollafjörður (Faxi Bay) fjord in western Iceland. The name Engey is composed of eng (meadow or uncut grassland) and ey (island). Engey is the second-largest island on the southeastern side of the Kollafjörður fjord after Viðey. The government bought the island from its last inhabitant (Sigurður Gíslason of Hamraendar) after World War II. Ownership was later transferred to the city of Reykjavík in 1978.

== Geography ==
Located north of the capital Reykjavík, the now-uninhabited island is 1.7 kilometres (5,600 ft) in length and around 400 metres (1,300 ft) in width. A lighthouse, originally built in 1902, is located towards the northern end of the island. The lighthouse was damaged and later restored in 1937.

In the bend off the southern tip of the island there is a long shoal called Engeyjarboði (also called Engeyjarrif). The shoal only comes up during higher low tide and is the sea can often be seen breaking on it. A buoy across from Reykjavík harbor marks the end of the breaker.

== History ==
The oldest sources about the settlement of Engey come from Njáls saga. There was a church on the island from 1379 to 1765.

In the 19th century, Engey's shipbuilders were well-known and the so-called Engeyjarlag (Engey style) of boat became the most common boat shape throughout Faxi Bay. The greatest of these shipbuilders was Kristinn Magnússon who built 220 boats, including larger ships, from 1853–1875. He also developed the rigging for a ship that became common in the Faxi Bay area for fishing using decked ships in partnership with Geir Zoëga and others.

The Engeyjarætt (Engey family) is named after the island. They are the descendants of Snorri Sigurðsson ríka ("the rich") who lived on the island for a long time and died there in 1841 when he was in his late 80s. Family members include Bjarni Benediktsson (prime minister of Iceland from 1963 to 1970), and former government ministers Björn Bjarnason and Ragnhildur Helgadóttir.

Engey was inhabited until 1950. All the houses on the island were burned down in 1966 since all the buildings were rotted and on the verge of collapse. There are some remains of military installations on Engey including an underground base. During World War II, forts were built there to defend the channel of Reykjavík harbor. Artifacts there are better preserved than those found in other places because the island became deserted shortly after the war ended.
