= Flateyjardalur =

Valley in Iceland

Coordinates: 66°06.44′N 17°53.90′W

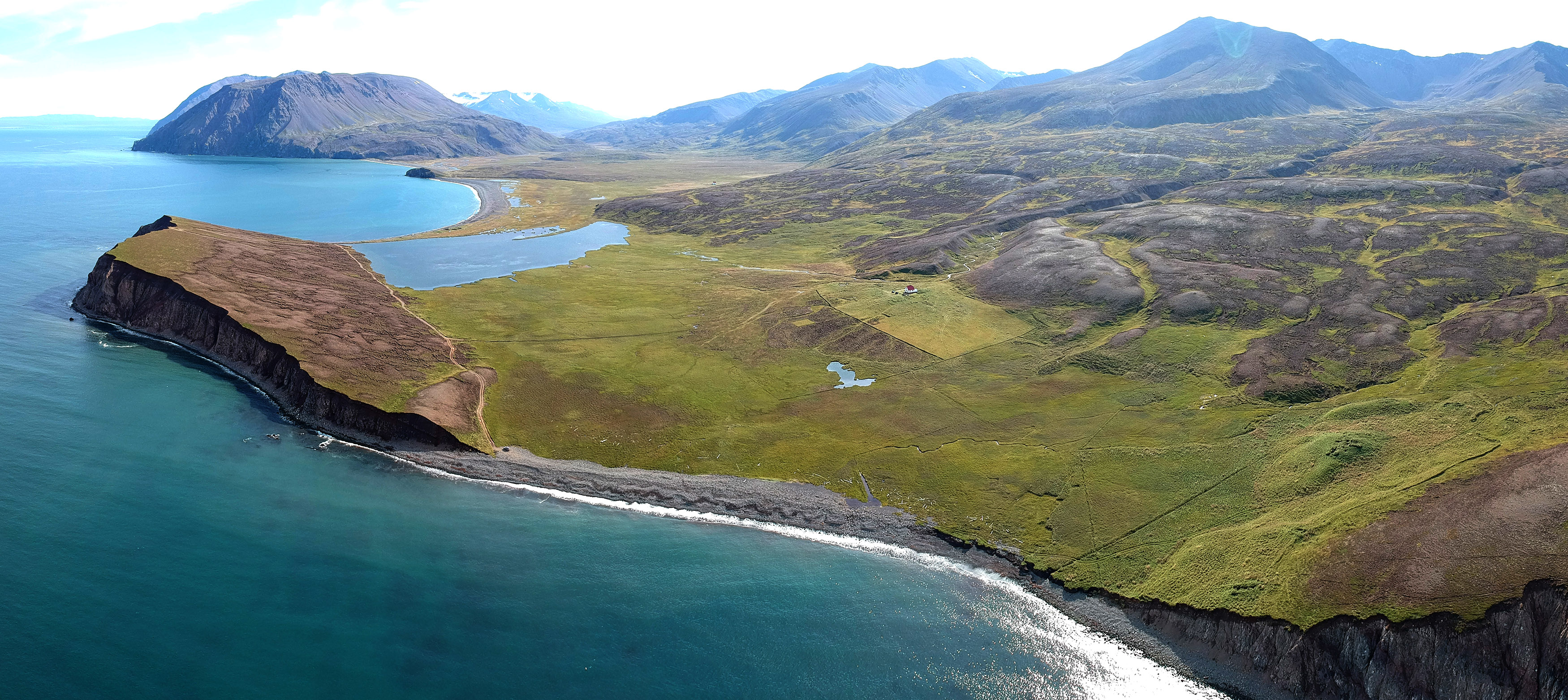
Flateyjardalur 2018

Flateyjardalur (Icelandic pronunciation: [ˈflaːtˌeiːjarˌtaːlʏr̥]) is a valley in northern Iceland by Skjálfandi bay on the Flateyjarskagi peninsula. The valley stretches from the coast and south to Fnjóskadalur valley. Flateyjardalur is named after the island of Flatey, which lies just off the shore. It is about 33 km long, almost straight with only a small bend at the end near the sea and has a direction almost perfectly from north to south.

Finnboga saga ramma, one of the Icelandic sagas, takes place in the area. The last inhabitants left the coast in 1953. The same year a road was built from Fnjóskadalur to Flateyjardalur, connecting the coast to other parts of the region. There are three concrete houses, built in the late 1920s, which today are only inhabited during the summer. By the old farm Brettingsstaðir is a cemetery surrounding the foundation of the old church of Brettingsstaðir, which was dismantled and moved to Flatey after the valley had become deserted. Many tourists visit Flateyjardalur during the summer.

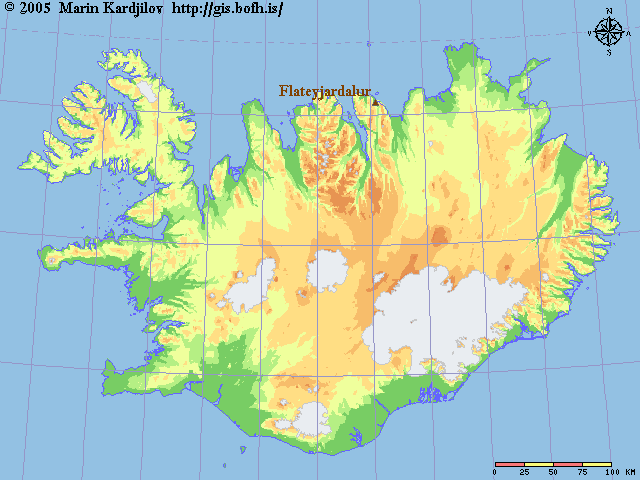
Location of Flateyjardalur
