= Pétur Guðmundsson =

Pétur Guðmundsson may refer to:

- Pétur Guðmundsson (1786–1852), patriarch of the Engeyjarætt
- Pétur Guðmundsson (basketball) (born 1958), Icelandic basketball player
- Pétur Guðmundsson (athlete) (born 1962), Icelandic shotputter
