= Fnjóskadalur =

Valley in Suður-Þingeyjarsýsla, Iceland

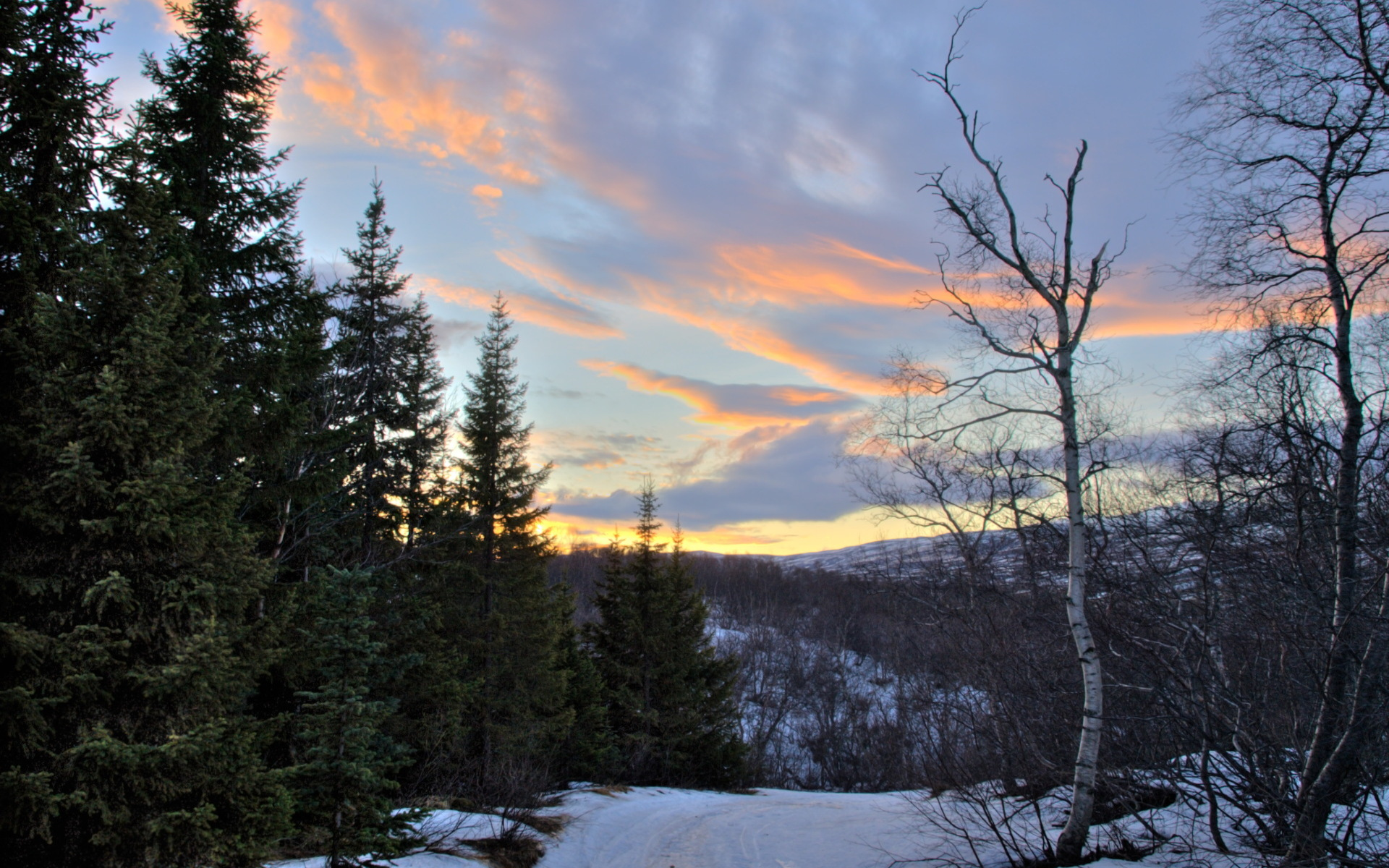
- View from Vaglaskógur forest
- Interactive map of Fnjóskadalur
- Coordinates: 65°44′N 17°54′W
- Country: Iceland
- County: Suður-Þingeyjarsýsla
- Municipality: Þingeyjarsveit

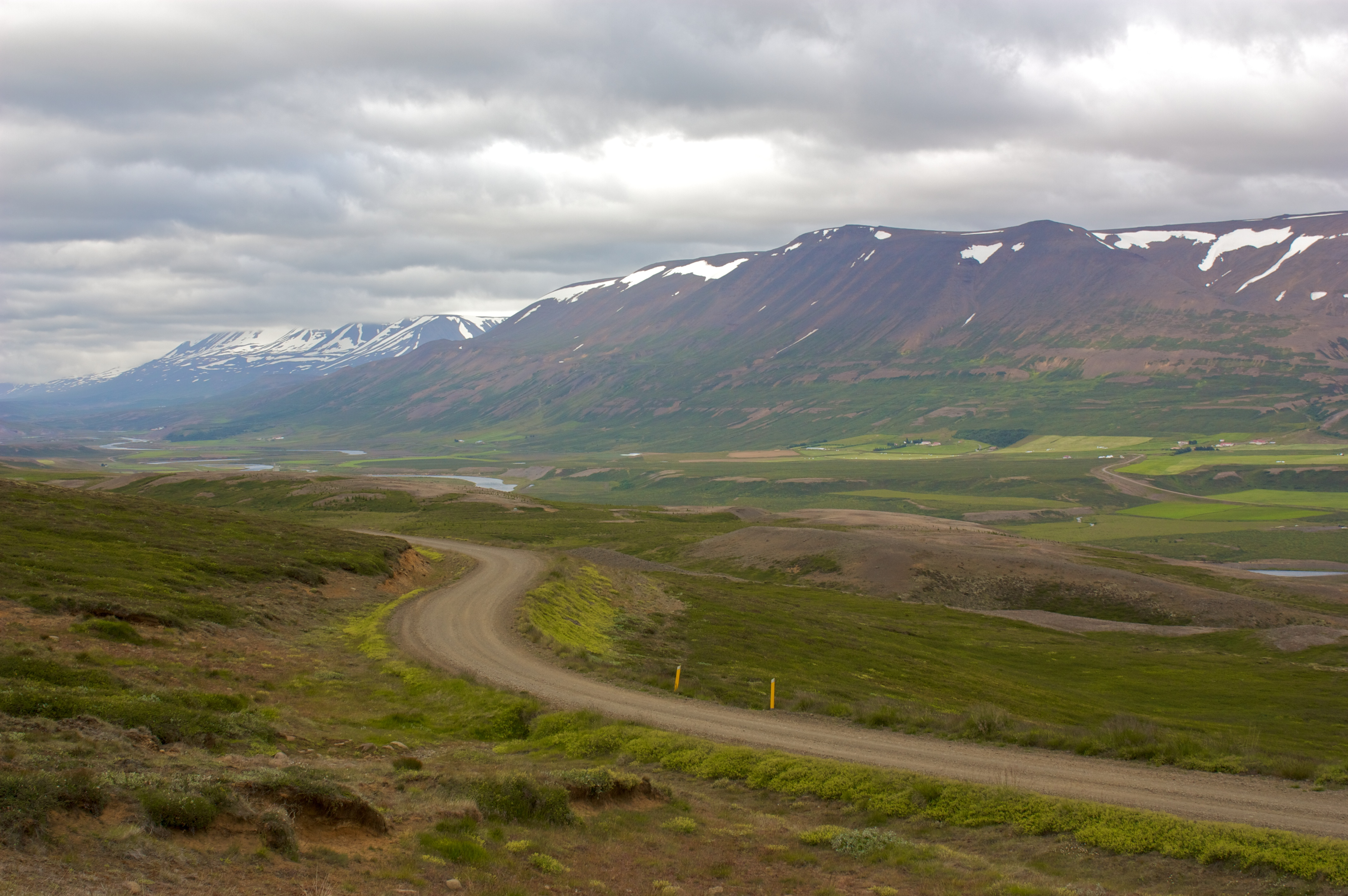
Fnjóskadalur with ice age glacial lake terraces

Fnjóskadalur (Icelandic pronunciation: [ˈfnjouskaˌtaːlʏr̥]) is an agricultural valley in northeastern Iceland, approximately 10 km northeast of Akureyri. Fnjóská, a popular salmon angling river and the longest spring-fed river in Iceland, runs through the valley. The river originates on Sprengisandur in the Highlands of Iceland.

== Overview ==
Vaglaskógur, the second largest forest in Iceland, is located around the center of the valley. Other woods in Fnjóskadalur are Lundsskógur and Þórðarstaðaskógur south of Vaglaskógur, and Skuggabjargarskógur in Dalsmynni, the extreme northern portion of the valley.

Þverá is the northernmost farm in Fnjóskadalur, located where the valley branches into Dalsmynni to the northwest, leading to sea in Eyjafjörður; and the much longer Flateyjardalur to the northeast, leading to sea in Skjálfandi bay.

== Etymology ==
The name Fnjóskadalur is formed from the Icelandic words fnjóskur (a dry piece of wood) and dalur (dale; valley).
