= Vaglaskógur =

Forest in Iceland

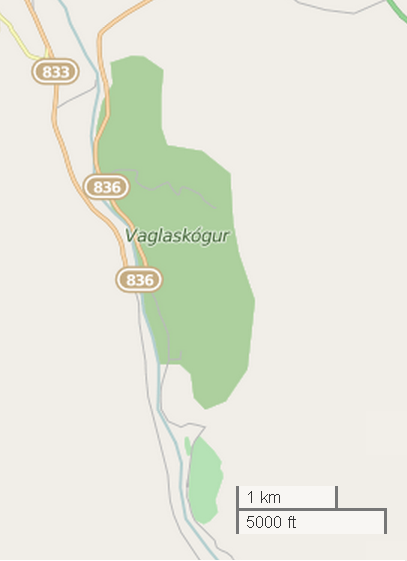

- Location within Iceland
- Location: Fnjóskadalur, Iceland
- Coordinates: 65.7167°N 17.8833°W
- Area: 300 ha (740 acres)

Vaglaskógur (Icelandic pronunciation: [ˈvaklaˌskouː(ɣ)ʏr̥]) is a 300-hectare forest in Fnjóskadalur, Iceland. It is the second largest forest area in the country. This area contains many birch trees and is a visitor attraction.

== Gallery ==
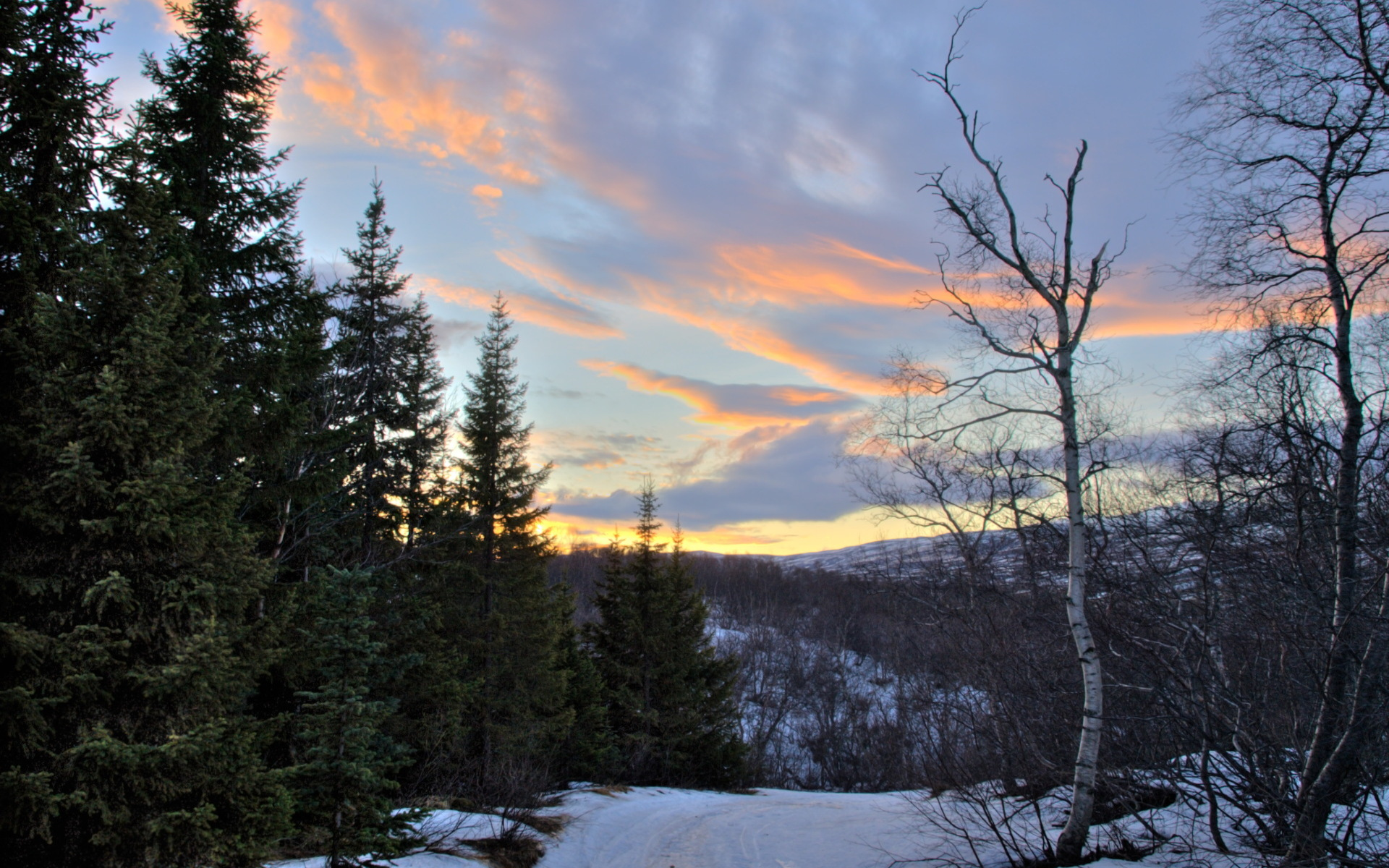

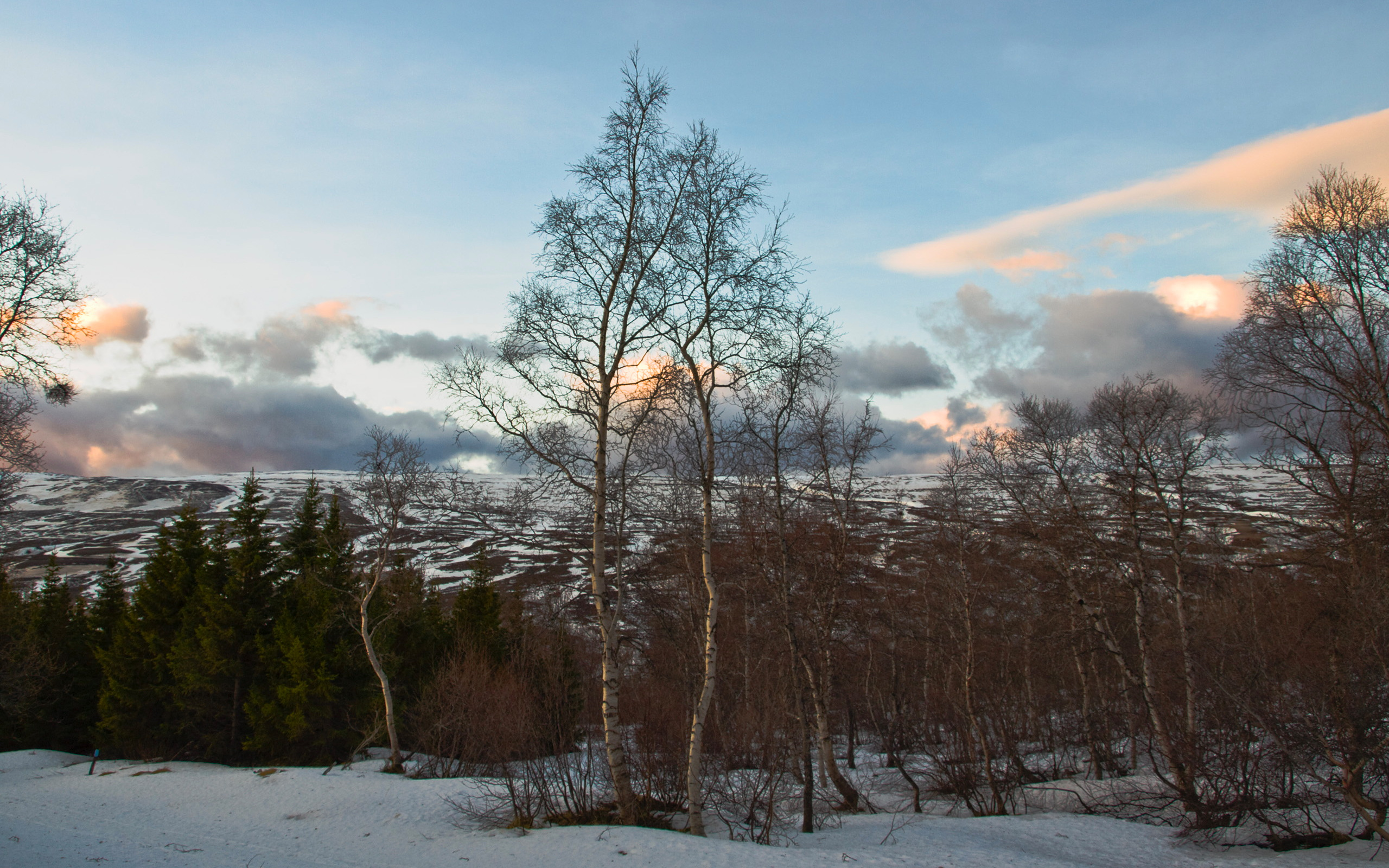

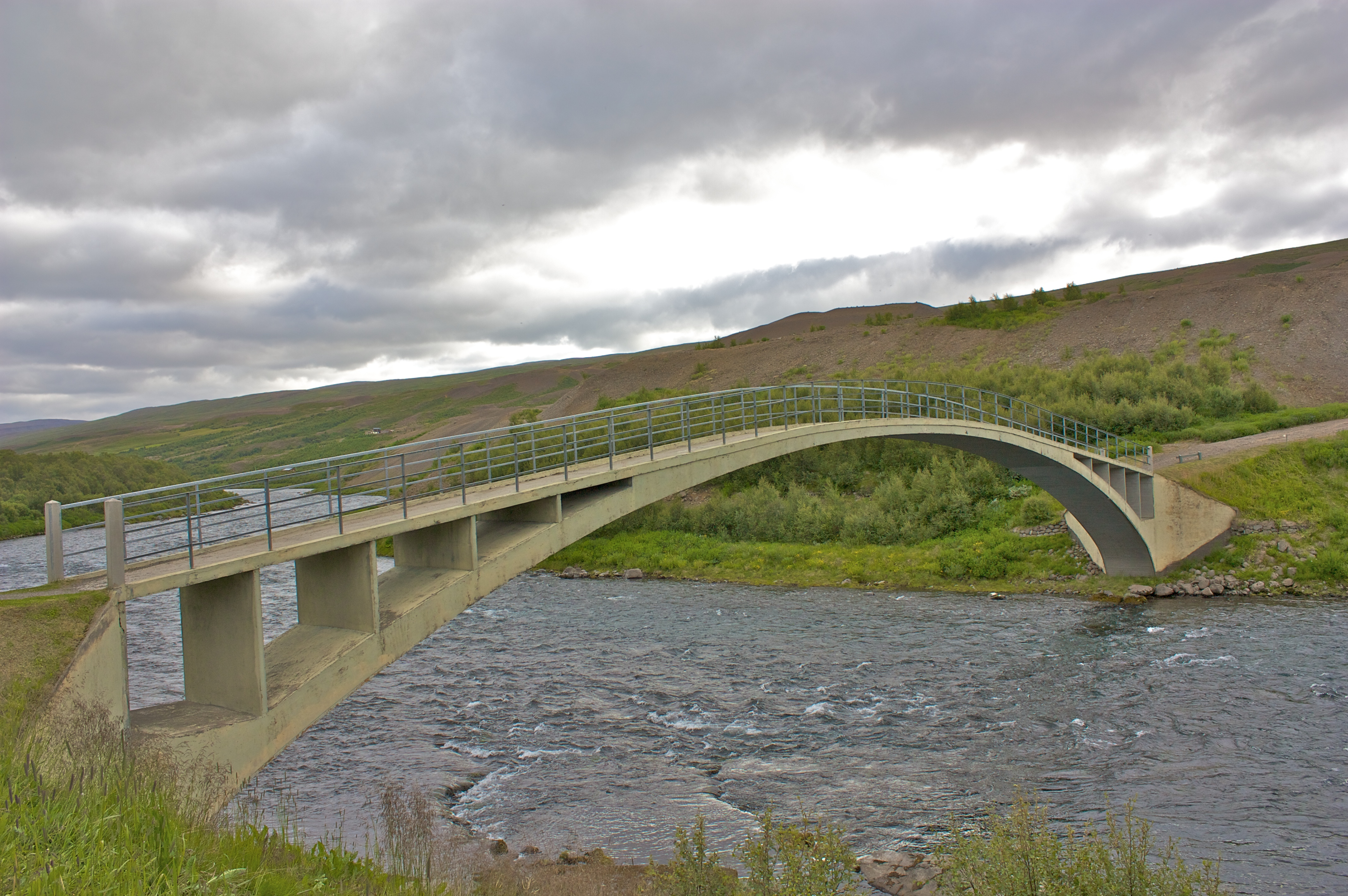
