= Barðaströnd =

Icelandic coast in southern Westfjords

Coordinates: 65.483°N 23.530°W

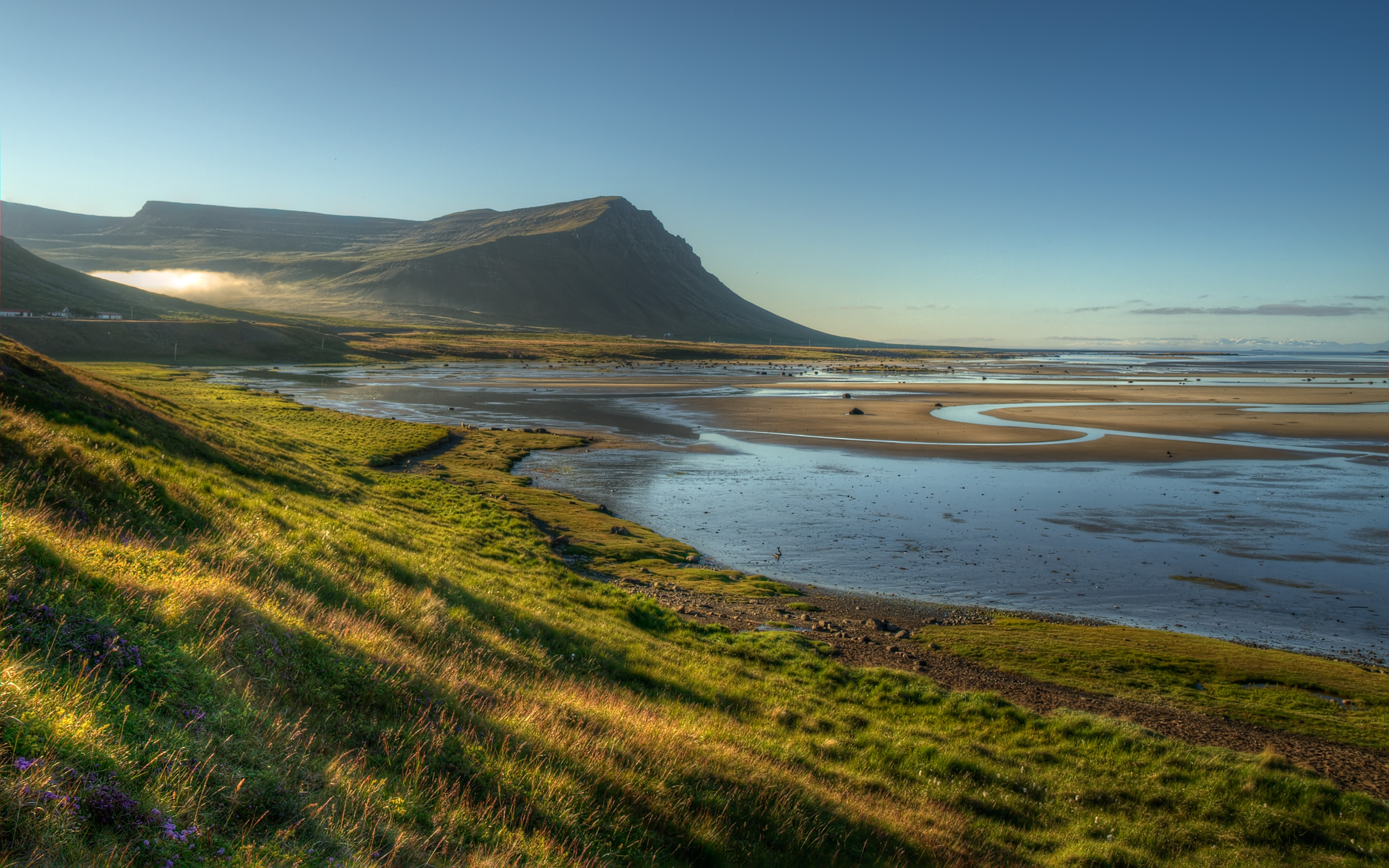
Barðaströnd

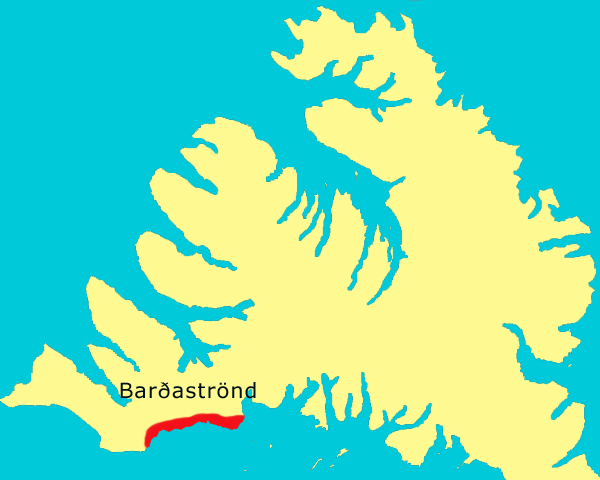
Barðaströnd highlighted on a map of Vestfirðir

Barðaströnd (Icelandic pronunciation: [ˈparðaˌstrœnt]) is an area of historical interest in northwestern Iceland. It is the coast between Vatnsfjörður and Sigluneshlíðar in southern Westfjords region. This is the place where Flóki Vilgerðarson first set up winter camp.
