= Málmey =

Uninhabited island off Iceland's coast

Coordinates: 66°1′4.83″N 19°32′6.08″W

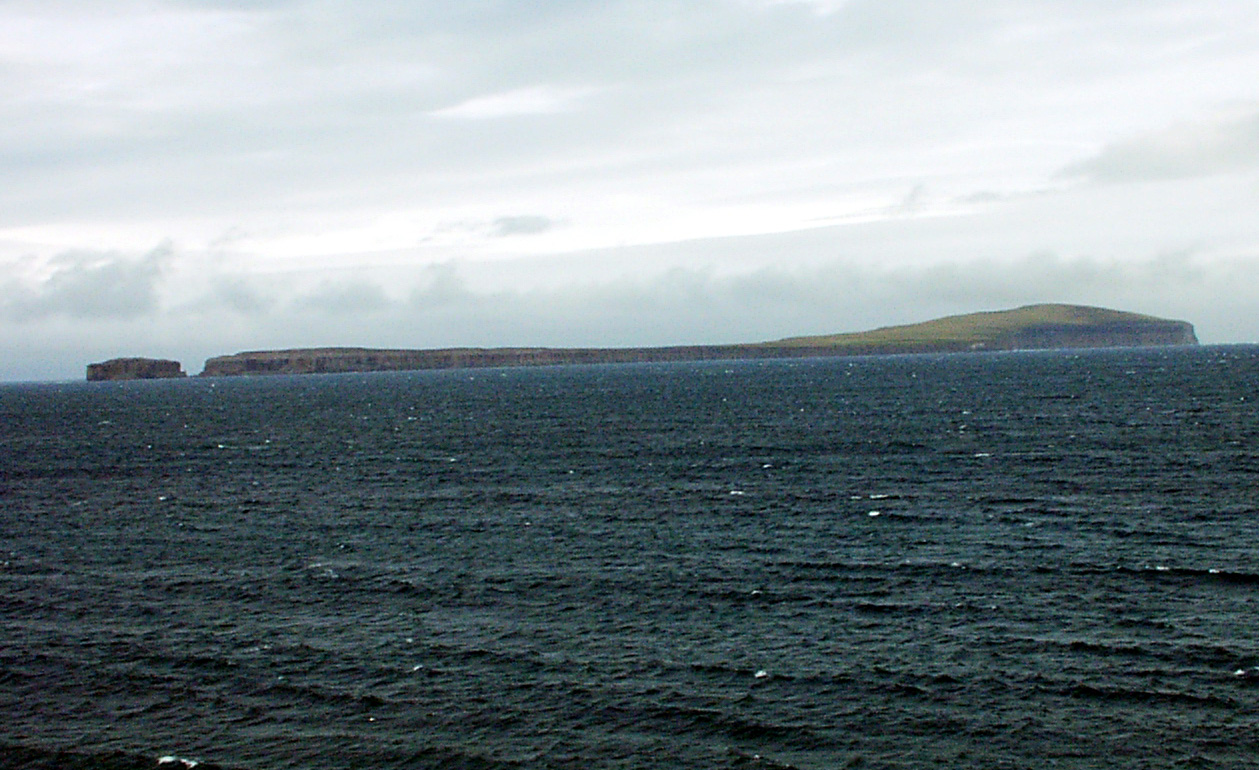
Málmey island

Málmey (Icelandic pronunciation: [ˈmaulmˌeiː]) is an uninhabited island off the northern coast of Iceland, one of the three islands in the Skagafjörður bay, along with Drangey and Lundey. It is located on the east side of the bay. Málmey is a long and narrow island, about 4 km long and about 1 km wide, and it is narrower at both the northern and southern ends. It is surrounded by cliffs on all sides, and it reaches an elevation of 156 m above sea level in its northern part.

On the southeast of the island there is a lighthouse which was built in 1937. The island was inhabited until 1950, when a fire destroyed the farm which housed 14 people and it has remained uninhabited since. Málmey is now property of the Lighthouse and Port authority of Iceland, and is only accessible by boat.

Málmey is mentioned in the Sturlunga saga as the place where, in 1221, the bishop Guðmundur Arason flees to escape Tumi Sighvatsson and his men, who threatened to kill him. Guðmundur left the island on Easter day, after his followers had killed Tumi Sighvatsson.
