= Puffin (disambiguation) =

Puffins are stocky black-and-white pelagic seabirds in the genus Fratercula, covering some types of auk.

Puffin or Puffins may also refer to

== Aircraft and missiles ==
- HMPAC Puffin, man-powered aircraft
- NASA Puffin, proposed single-seat proprotor
- Parnall Puffin, experimental amphibious fighter-reconnaissance biplane
- AUM-N-6 Puffin, an experimental American torpedo-carrying missile

== Ships ==
- Puffin (lightvessel), a lightvessel assigned to the Daunt Rock station from 1887-1896
- HMS Puffin (L52), a Kingfisher-class sloop active 1936 to 1945
- USS Puffin (AMc-29), a coastal minesweeper active 1941 to 1944

== Books and television ==
- Puffin Books, an imprint of Penguin Books specialising in children's literature
- Puffin Rock, a children's TV series from Northern Ireland
- Puffins (TV series), an animated television series
- Puffin's Pla(i)ce, a series for children, shown on Channel Television from 1963 to 2013.

== Other uses ==
- Oscar Puffin, official mascot of Channel Television and star of Puffin's Pla(i)ce.
- Puffin (currency), an unofficial unit of currency issued on Lundy
- Puffin Browser, a web browser for various computing platforms
- Puffin crossing, a road safety feature
- Puffin dog, a small dog breed of the Spitz type that originates from Norway
- Puffin Island (disambiguation)
- Puffin, a fictional character in The Swan Princess film series
- some of the butterflies in the genus Appias

== See also ==
- Puffin's Club, a private members' luncheon club established in the 1960s
- Puffinus, a genus of seabirds, covering some types of shearwaters
