= Náttfari =

Viking (fl. 835–870)

Náttfari (Old Norse: [ˈnɑːtːˌfɑre]; Modern Icelandic: [ˈnauhtˌfaːrɪ]; fl. 835–870) was a crew member who escaped his master, Garðar Svavarsson, and may have become the first permanent resident of Iceland in the 9th century. The earliest account of his story is found in the 11th-century Icelandic Book of Settlements (Landnámabók).

Náttfari escaped when Garðar set sail to the Hebrides from the newfound island which he named Garðarshólmi, now known as Iceland. When Garðar Svavarsson left Iceland after a winter's stay in the spring of 870, moving east towards Norway, a boat drifted away. On the boat were Náttfari with a slave (thræll) and a bond woman (ambátt). Garðar reached the shores of Iceland on the north coast. Náttfari found a place for them to live now known as Náttfaravík, a cove on Skjálfandi Bay which is situated directly opposite to the town of Húsavík.

== Bibliography ==
- Friðriksson, Theódór (1960). Náttfari: skáldsaga. (Reykjavík: Helgafell).
- Sigurðsson, Jón (1968). Garðar og náttfari. (Reykjavík: Leiftur).
