= List of fjords of Iceland =

Main bays and fjords of Iceland

The fjords of Iceland, listed in a clockwise direction round the island from the SW to the east. There are no important fjords along the south coast: most of the inlets there are lagoons.

== Western fjords ==
- Faxaflói
  - Stakksfjörður
  - Hafnarfjörður
  - Skerjafjörður
  - Kollafjörður
  - Hvalfjörður
  - Borgarfjörður
  - Haffjörður
- Breiðafjörður
  - Fjords on northern Snæfellsnes and in Dalasýsla ("Dalir"):
    - Grundarfjörður
    - Kolgrafafjörður
    - Hraunsfjörður
    - Vigrafjörður
    - Álftafjörður
    - Hvammsfjörður
  - Fjords in Barðaströnd:
    - Gilsfjörður
    - Króksfjörður
    - Berufjörður
    - Þorskafjörður
      - Djúpifjörður
      - Gufufjörður
    - Kollafjörður
    - Kvígindisfjörður
    - Skálmarfjörður
      - Vattarfjörður
    - Kerlingarfjörður
      - Mjóifjörður
    - Kjálkafjörður
    - Vatnsfjörður

== Westfjords ==
- Patreksfjörður
- Tálknafjörður
- Arnarfjörður
  - Suðurfirðir
    - Fossfjörður
    - Reykjarfjörður
    - Trostansfjörður
    - Geirþjófsfjörður
  - Borgarfjörður
- Dýrafjörður
- Önundarfjörður
- Súgandafjörður
- Ísafjarðardjúp
  - Skutulsfjörður
  - Álftafjörður
  - Seyðisfjörður
  - Hestfjörður
  - Skötufjörður
  - Mjóifjörður
  - Vatnsfjörður
  - Reykjarfjörður
  - Ísafjörður
  - Kaldalón
  - Jökulfirðir
    - Leirufjörður
    - Hrafnsfjörður
    - Lónafjörður
    - Veiðileysufjörður
    - Hesteyrarfjörður
- Furufjörður
- Þaralátursfjörður
- Reykjarfjörður nyrðri
- Bjarnarfjörður nyrðri
- Eyvindarfjörður
- Ófeigsfjörður
- Ingólfsfjörður
- Norðurfjörður
- Reykjarfjörður (Ströndum)
- Veiðileysufjörður (Ströndum)

== Northwestern region ==
- Bjarnarfjörður
- Steingrímsfjörður
- Kollafjörður
- Bitrufjörður
- Hrútafjörður
- Miðfjörður
- Húnafjörður
- Skagafjörður
- Siglufjörður
- Héðinsfjörður
- Ólafsfjörður

== Northeastern region ==
- Eyjafjörður
- Þorgeirsfjörður
- Hvalvatnsfjörður
- Skjálfandi
- Öxarfjörður
- Þistilfjörður
  - Lónafjörður
- Bakkaflói
  - Finnafjörður
  - Miðfjörður
  - Bakkafjörður
- Vopnafjörður
  - Nýpsfjörður
- Héraðsflói

== Eastern fjords ==
- Borgarfjörður eystri
- Loðmundarfjörður
- Seyðisfjörður
- Mjóifjörður
- Norðfjarðarflói
  - Norðfjörður
  - Hellisfjörður
  - Viðfjörður
- Reyðarfjörður
  - Eskifjörður
- Fáskrúðsfjörður
- Stöðvarfjörður
- Berufjörður
- Hamarsfjörður
- Álftafjörður
- Lónsfjörður
- Papafjörður
- Skarðsfjörður
- Hornafjörður
