= Lundey, Skjálfandi =

Island in Iceland

Coordinates: 66°06′53″N 17°22′10″W

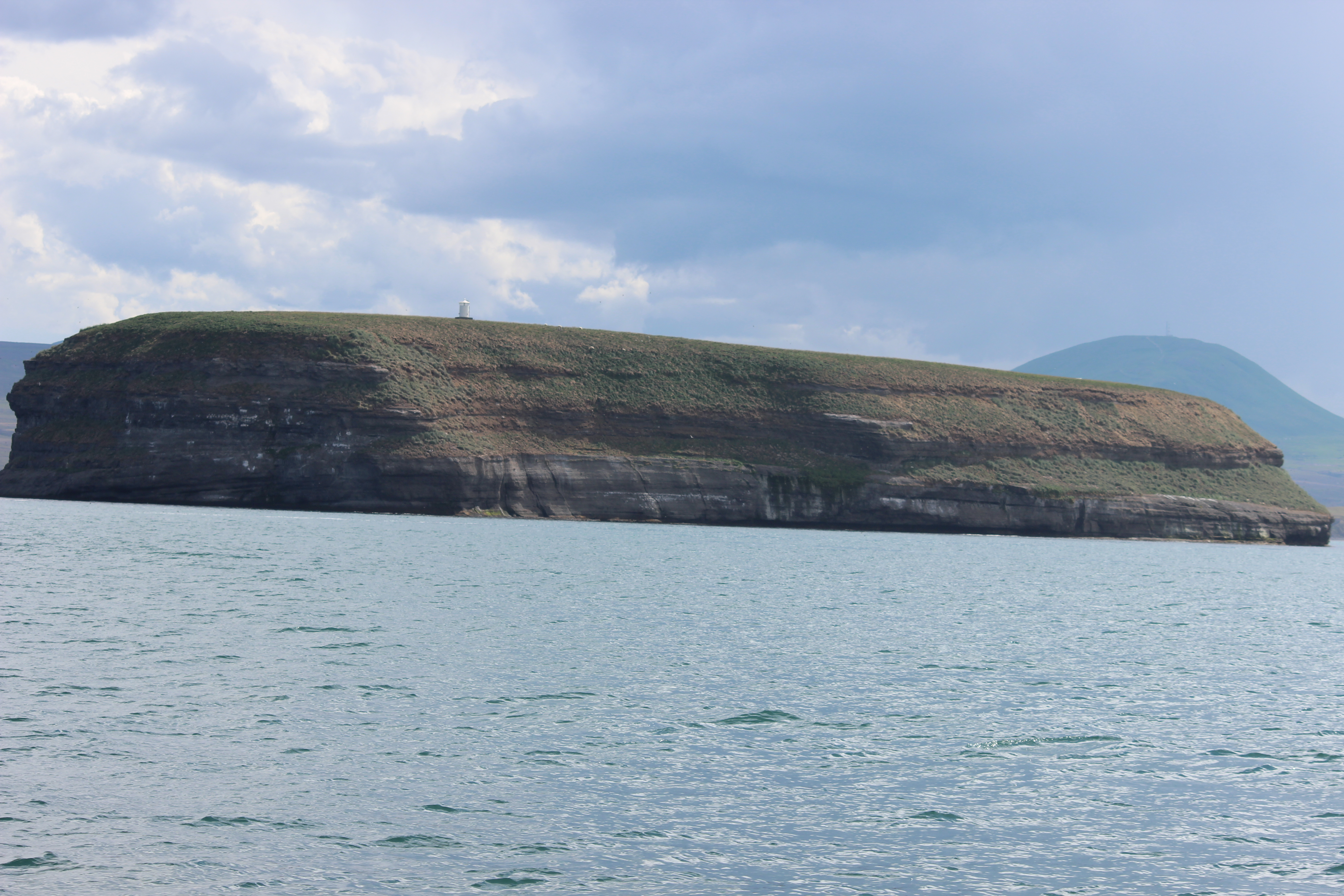
Lundey Island as viewed from the North

Lundey (Icelandic: [ˈlʏntˌeiː], "Puffin Island") is a small, uninhabited island in Skjálfandi bay located about 8.3 kilometres (5.2 miles) from Húsavík, in northern Iceland. It is the smaller of two islands in the bay, the other being Flatey. Lundey is about 300 metres (980 ft) long and 150 metres (490 ft) wide. Its highest point lies about 34 metres (112 ft) above sea level. Its name in Icelandic means "Puffin"; over 200,000 Atlantic Puffin breed on the island's cliffs in the summer hence its name. The island lies only 50 kilometres (31 mi) south of the Arctic Circle and therefore experiences 24 hours of daylight during the summer solstice.

== History ==
Though uninhabited, Lundey is privately owned and there are multiple structures on the island including a lighthouse.

== Environment ==
Skjálfandi bay is an excellent place for fishing, especially for cod and lumpfish. Arctic Skua and Northern Fulmar are common around Lundey during the Summer in addition to the nesting Puffins there. Many of the whale watching tours departing from Húsavík sail past the island to showcase the breeding birds there. Humpback Whales and Pilot Whales are also often sighted nearby.

There are two other islands known as Lundey in Iceland: one in Skagafjörður fjörd in north Iceland and another in the southwest near Reykjavík.
