= Viðey =

Island in Iceland

- Location within Iceland

Geography
- Location: Faxaflói
- Coordinates: 64°10′N 21°52′W
- Area: 1.6 km^{2} (0.62 sq mi)

Administration
- Iceland
- Constituency: Reykjavík North
- Region: Höfuðborgarsvæðið (Capital Region)
- Municipality: Reykjavíkurborg

Demographics
- Languages: Icelandic
- Ethnic groups: Icelanders

Additional information
- Time zone: WET (UTC+0)

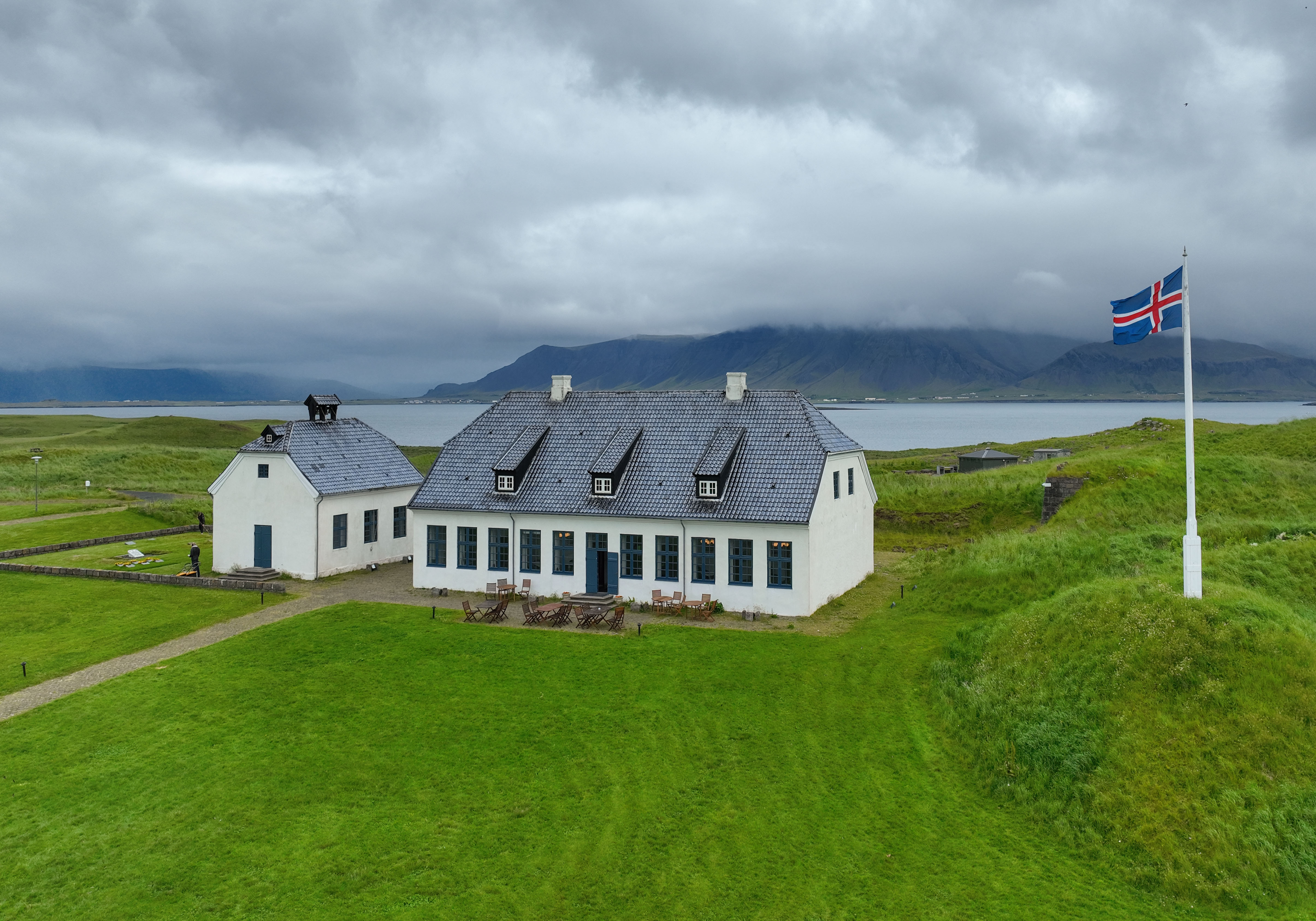
Viðey House with Esjan in the background

Viðey (Icelandic pronunciation: [ˈvɪːðˌeiː]; sometimes anglicised as Videy) is the largest island of the Kollafjörður Bay in Iceland, just outside the capital of Reykjavík.

== Overview ==
The island covers 1.7 square kilometres (0.7 square miles); its highest point is 32 metres (105 feet) above sea level. The island is divided by a narrow piece of land (isthmus) creating the West Island, East Island and the largest Home Island. The island has a rich bird life with about 30 species breeding here, such as Puffins, Guillemots, and Fulmars along its coast. The well-vegetated island has areas of bog, grey basalt on the West Island and eastern shore and at least 156 species of plant.

Visitors can reach the island by ferry. In the summer ferries leave daily from Skarfabakki, Harpa, and Aegisgarour pier. In the winter, ferry service is from Skarfabakki on weekends only. The Reykjavík City Card includes free ferry transfer to and from the island.

== Geology ==
About two million years ago during the Pleistocene, Viðey was an active volcano with a massive caldera. The remains of this caldera are much larger than the modern island itself, with the island near the caldera's center. The rest of the caldera underlies a large part of what is now Kollafjörður.

== History ==
The island has archaeological remains dating back to the early 10th century and was the site where the "father of Reykjavík" Skuli Magnusson constructed his home and a church in the 12th century. From 1225 to 1539 an Augustine Monastery was established on the island. There is a deserted village on the island, as the island's last inhabitants left in 1943.

On the Western Island is the Viðeyjarstofa House. Viðeyjarstofa House was constructed in 1753–1755 by the Danish government. The Danish architect Nicolai Eigtved designed the House. The House now houses a restaurant. Two hike trails start from behind the restaurant and in the summer there is horse rental and a riding school.

In 1988 American artist Richard Serra was invited by the National Gallery of Iceland to build a work. Serra chose Viðey Island as the site for Afangar (Stations, Stops on the Road, To Stop and Look: Forward and Back, To Take It All In) (1990). The sculpture consists of nine pairs of basalt columns (a material indigenous to Iceland) and placed along the periphery of Vesturey, the northwest part of the island. All nine locations share the same elevations in that the stones of each pair are situated at an elevation of 9 and 10 meters, respectively. Each set of stones is level at the top. All stones at the higher elevation measure 3 meters; all stones at the lower elevation measure 4 meters. Because of the variance of topography, the stones in a set are sometimes closer together, sometimes further apart. The rise and fall of Viðey Island and the surrounding landscape is seen against the fixed measure of the standing stones.The stones are visible along the horizon of the island and orient the viewer against the rise and fall of the surrounding landscape.

The Imagine Peace Tower is located on the island. It is a "Tower of Light" envisioned and built by artist Yoko Ono as a memorial to John Lennon. According to the Associated Press: "The tower is a beam of light, radiating from a wishing well bearing the words "imagine peace" in 24 languages. The plan is for it to be lit each year between his birthday, October 9, and his death, December 8."

Charles Lindbergh visited the island when he was planning his flight across the Atlantic. In Philip Roth's novel The Plot Against America, Lindbergh visits Reykjavík again in 1941, then as President of the United States, and signs a peace treaty with Adolf Hitler.

The name is thought to reflect that it was forested upon the arrival of the first settlers (Wood Island) rather than, which is also possible, that it simply had driftwood.
