= Lundey, Skagafjörður =

Island in Skagafjörður fjord, Iceland

Coordinates: 65°45′44.4″N 19°27′02.2″W

Lundey (Icelandic: [ˈlʏntˌeiː], "Puffin Island") is a small, uninhabited island in Skagafjörður fjord located about 2 kilometres (1.2 mi) from the eastern mouth of the Héraðsvötn River, in northern Iceland. It is one of three islands in the bay, the others being Málmey, and Drangey. Lundey is low lying and grassy with an area of approximately 6.3 hectares (0.024 sq mi). The island is about 300 metres (980 ft) long and 100 metres (330 ft) wide. Its name in Icelandic means "Puffin"; And each summer, Atlantic Puffin breed on the island's cliffs hence its name. The island is only accessible by boat and lies approximately 9 kilometres (5.6 mi) from the nearest harbor in the town of Sauðárkrókur. There are two other islands known as Lundey in Iceland; One in Skjálfandi Bay in northern Iceland and another near Reykjavík.

== History ==
Though uninhabited, there is one standing structure on Lundey and viewed from above the island shows evidence of historically collapsed buildings.

== Environment ==
Arctic Skua and Northern Fulmar, are common around Lundey during the Summer in addition to a nesting population of over 20,000 pairs of Atlantic Puffins. The sizable population makes up about 1% of Iceland's total puffin count and is considered an internationally important seabird settlement.
