= Faxaflói =

Bay in southwestern Iceland

Coordinates: 64°24′N 23°00′W

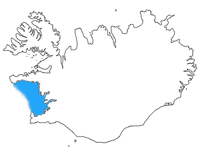
Faxa Bay shown in blue

Faxaflói (Icelandic: [ˈfaksaˌflouːɪ]), sometimes Faxa Bay, Faxe Bay or Faxi Bay, is a bay in southwest Iceland, between the peninsulas of Snæfellsnes and Reykjanes.

== Name ==
The name Faxaflói means 'Faxi's Bay' or 'Faxe's Bay'. The first part, Faxa, is the genitive of the name Faxi or Faxe, referring to a man, on one of the first Norse boat trips to the island, the voyage of Hrafna-Flóki.

== Geography ==
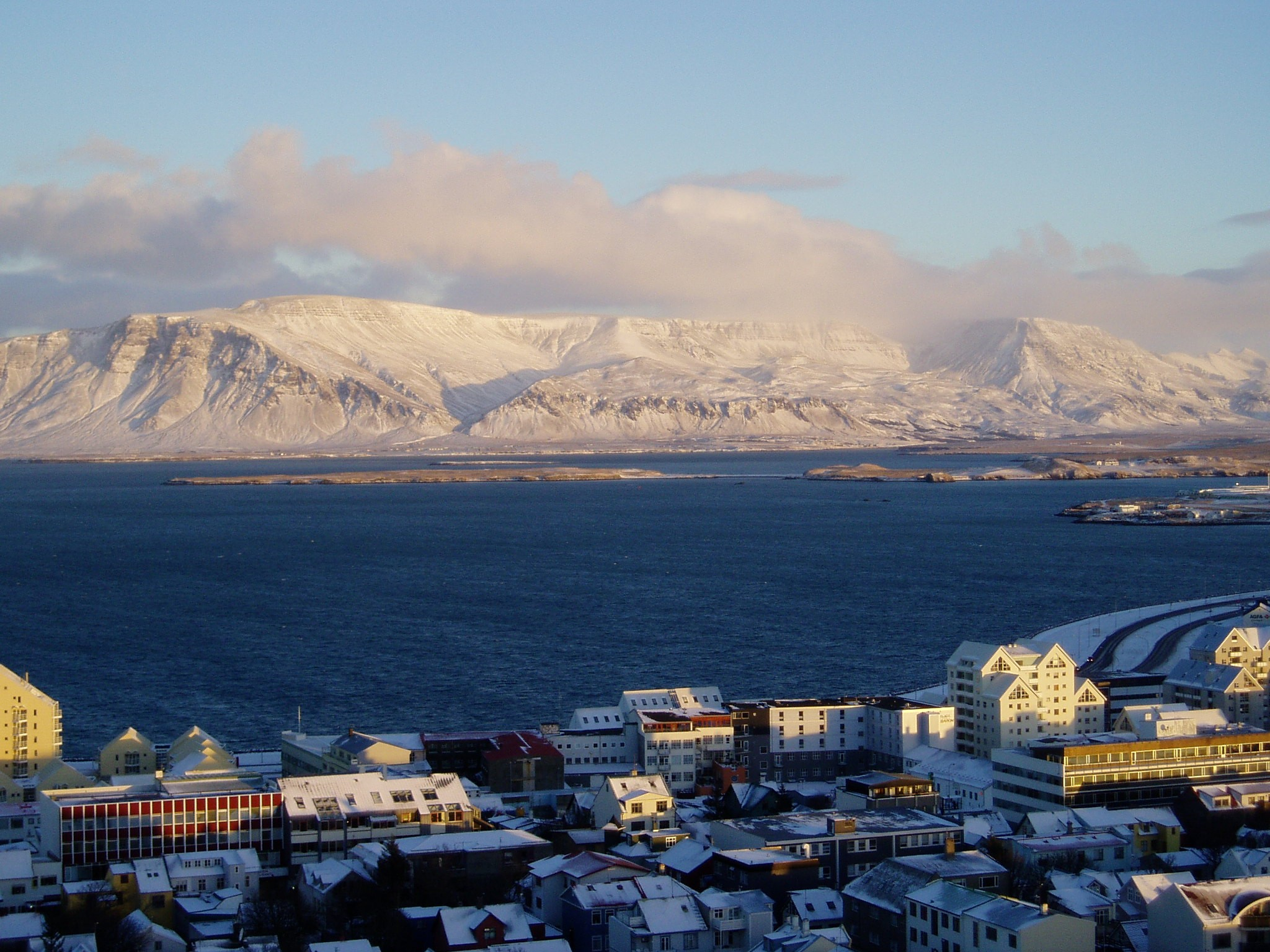
Reykjavík with Faxa Bay

The capital of the island, Reykjavík, is situated on its southern shore within the minor fjord Kollafjörður. From Reykjavik, it is possible to see the peninsula of Akranes in the northeast and even the Snæfellsjökull at a distance of about 120 km (75 mi). This bay has few islands and the ones it does have are close to land, in particular contrast to the bay directly north of it, Breiðafjörður, which has the most islands of any bay in Iceland.

=== Islands in Faxaflói Bay near Reykjavík ===
- Akurey
- Engey
- Hólmar
- Lundey
- Viðey
- Þerney

== History ==
Faxa Bay has been a source of nourishment of the people living on its shore. In former times, fishermen went out in small boats to fish near the shore. Today the ships are much larger, but have to go further out to sea to catch fish. Just north of Reykjavík in Kollafjörður is the small island Viðey. It has been uninhabited since 1943, but a former settlement was found dating from the 10th century. During the 12th century, a chapel was constructed, and a monastery was founded in 1225, existing until the Protestant Reformation at the end of the 16th century. The island and the remains of the settlement can be visited by taking a ferry from Reykjavík harbour.
