= Þaralátursfjörður =

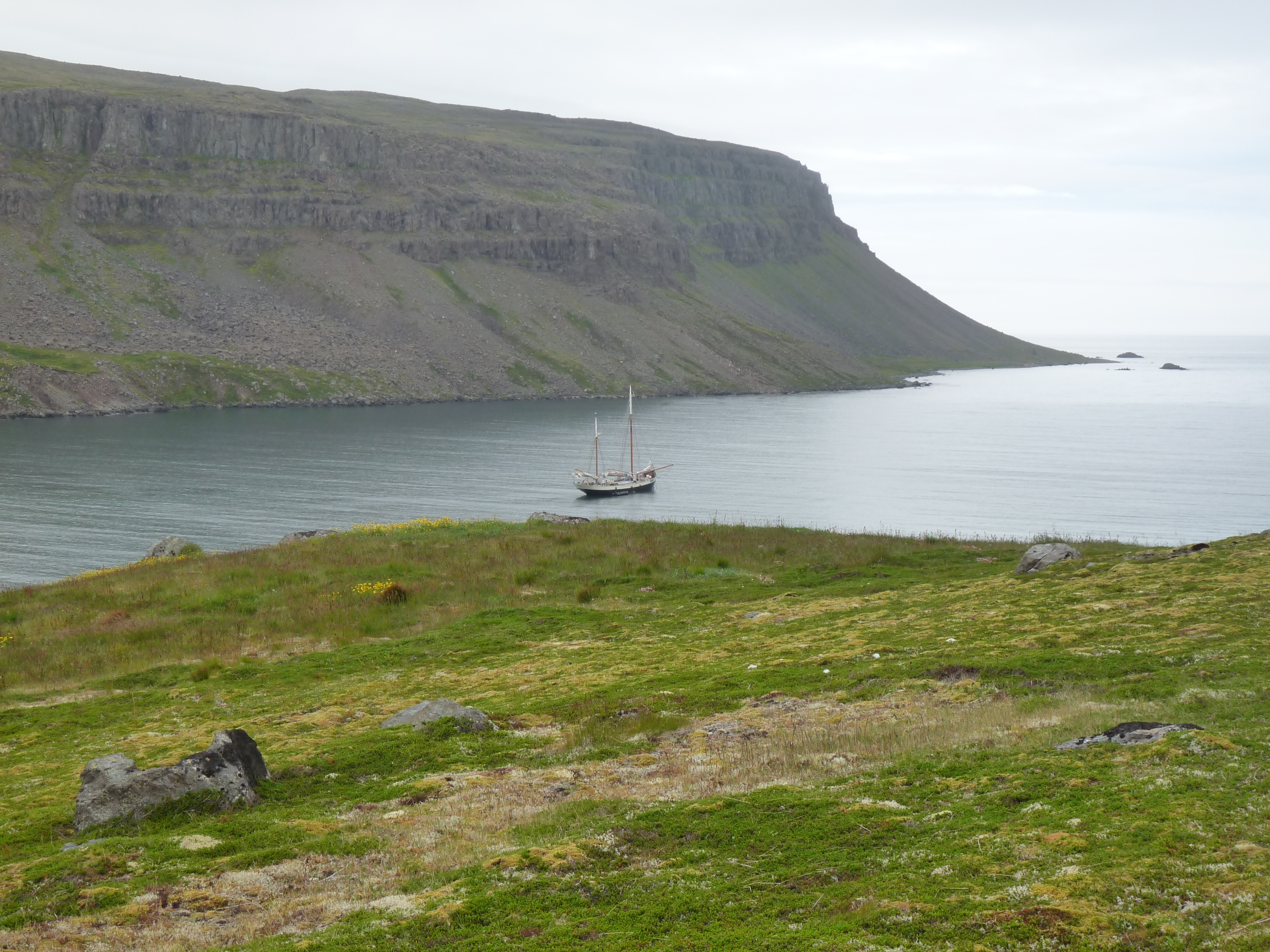

- Location of Þaralátursfjörður in Iceland
- Coordinates: 66°15′N 22°8′W
- Country: Iceland
- Constituency: Northwest Constituency
- Region: Westfjords
- Municipality: Ísafjarðarbær
- Time zone: UTC+0 (GMT)

Þaralátursfjörður (Icelandic pronunciation: [ˈθaːraˌlauːtʏr̥sˌfjœrðʏr̥]) is a short and small fjord in the Westfjords of Iceland, on the Hornstrandir peninsula. The only farm in the valley is now desolated.
