= Jörundur Svavarsson =

Jörundur Svavarsson is a professor in marine biology at the University of Iceland. His fields of research are marine invertebrates, marine biodiversity and ecotoxicology.

According to Web of Science Prof. Svavarsson has published 49 papers in peer-reviewed journals, with 13 or them being cited more than 11 times. He is currently the head of the department of Biology at University of Iceland.

Svavarsson has spearheaded several cultural and historic projects, including an exhibition on the explorations of Jean-Baptiste Charcot. In 2012, the French Government awarded Svavarsson the Chevalier des Palmes Académiques for this exhibition. He has studied the interaction between pilot whales and orcas.

The most widely referred to are:

- Stephensen E, Svavarsson J, Sturve J, et al. "Biochemical indicators of pollution exposure in shorthorn sculpin (Myoxocephalus scorpius), caught in four harbours on the southwest coast of Iceland" Aquatic Toxicology 48 (4): 431-442 Apr 2000 Times Cited: 39
- Fricke, H, Giere O, Steter K, Alfredsson, GA., Kristjansson JK, Stoffers P, and Svavarsson S "Hydrothermal vent communities at the shallow subpolar mid-atlantic Ridge." Marine Biology 102 (3): 425-429 1989 Times cited: 37
- Svavarsson S, Brattegard T, Stromberg JO. "Distribution and diversity patterns of asellote isopods (Crustacea) in the deep Norwegian and Greenland seas." Progress in Oceanography 24 (1-4): 297-310 1990. Times cited: 33
- Svavarsson S, Gudmundsson G, Brattegard T,"Feeding by assellote isopods (Crustacea) on Foraminifers (Protozoa) in the deep sea. Deep-Sea Research Part I: Oceanographic Research Papers 40 (6): 1225-1239 JUN 1993 Times cited: 29
