= Brynjudalsá =

River in Iceland

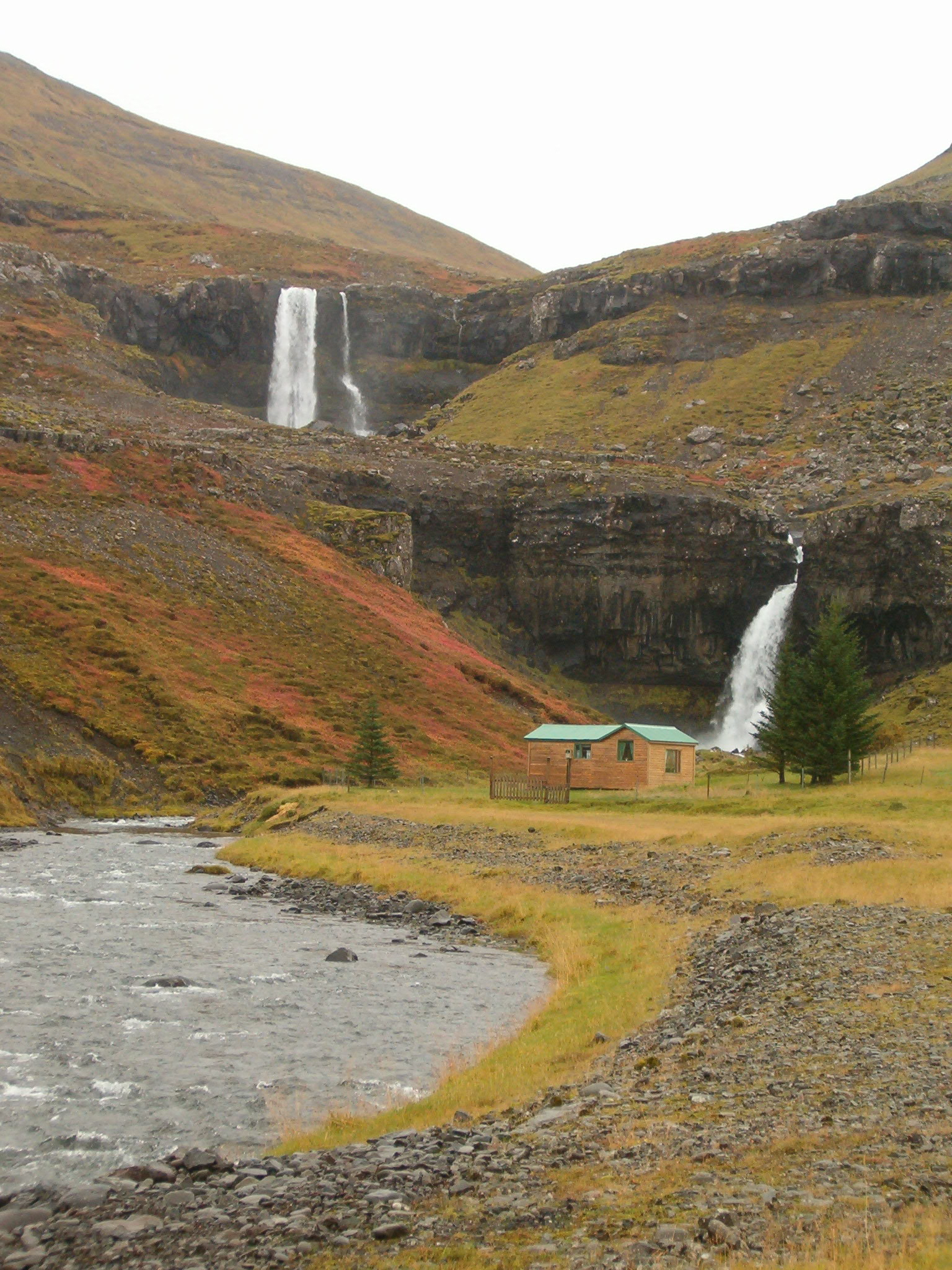
- Waterfalls at Brynjudalsá

Location
- Country: Iceland

Physical characteristics
- Mouth
  - coordinates: 64°21′31″N 21°24′30″W

Brynjudalsá is a river in Hvalfjörður, Iceland. The river is a popular fishing spot, due to the presence of Salmon and Sea Trout.
