= Vífill =

Vífill (Old Norse: [ˈwiːvelː]; Modern Icelandic: [ˈviːvɪtl̥]) is the name of different minor characters who appear in several Old Norse sources:

1. Þorsteins saga Víkingssonar (the paternal grandfather of the protagonist in the story)
2. Hrólfs saga kraka ok kappa hans (saves the lives of young Hroðgar and his brother Halga)
3. Landnámabók
4. Kálfsvísa (appears to be one of king Onela's warriors, and a comrade of Weohstan)
5. Eiríks saga rauða
6. Hálfs saga ok Hálfsrekka
7. Orvar-Odd's saga (mentioned in Hjalmar's death song)
