= Flatey, Skjálfandi =

Island in Skjálfandi, Iceland

Flatey
- Location within Iceland

Geography
- Coordinates: 66°09′54″N 17°51′35″W
- Constituency: Northeast
- Region: Northeastern Region
- Municipality: Þingeyjarsveit

Demographics
- Languages: Icelandic
- Ethnic groups: Icelanders

Additional information
- Time zone: WET (UTC+0)

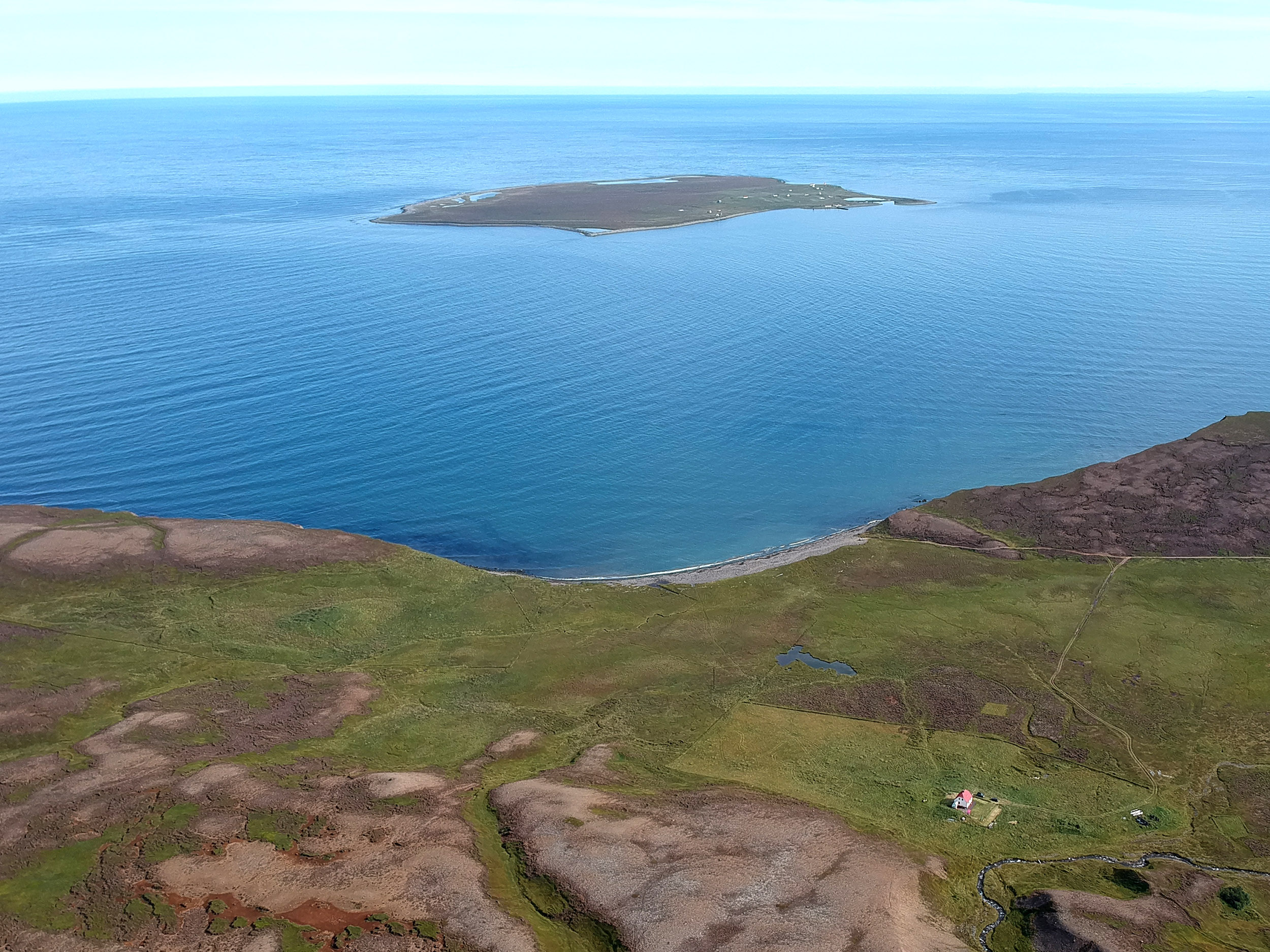
Flatey seen from land

Flatey (Icelandic pronunciation: [ˈflaːtˌeiː]) is an island on Skjálfandi bay located about 8.7 kilometres (4 11/16 nautical miles) from Húsavík, in northern Iceland. Its name in Icelandic means "flat island"; its highest point is only about 22 metres (72 feet) above mean sea level, hence its name. It is 2.5 kilometres (1 1/2 miles) long and 1.7 kilometres (1 1/16 miles) wide. It is the fifth-largest island around Iceland. The Flateyjardalur coast and Flateyjardalsheiði valley are named after Flatey.

== History ==
People first settled on Flatey in early historic times, but it never had a large population. The highest number of inhabitants was reached in 1942, when there were 120 people. As other villages and cities nearby grew, it was very difficult for Flatey to compete with them and the inhabitants started to leave the island, with the last remaining resident leaving in 1967. Now it is only inhabited seasonally during summer when many tourists visit the island.

There are only a few buildings on the island, the most important of which are: a schoolhouse built in 1929, an ancient church shut down in 1884, a lighthouse built in 1913 and rebuilt in 1963 and a radiotelegraph built in 1931. The old church was replaced in 1960 by the church of Brettingsstaðir in Flateyjardalur, which was taken apart and moved out to Flatey.

== Environment ==
Skjálfandi bay is an excellent place for fishing, especially for cod and lumpfish, so it is from the sea that most inhabitants take their living. The soil is very fertile, so they also practice agriculture. The inhabitants are completely autonomous, and almost all they do is for their own consumption. Every house had a cow for milking and some sheep and hens.

One of the things that attract the most tourists is the great number of bird species to be found on the island. Thirty of the thirty-seven species of bird in Iceland are found there during the breeding season: puffins, terns, Eurasian whimbrels, and plovers are examples.
