= Skjálfandi =

Bay in Iceland

Coordinates: 66°05′N 17°33′W

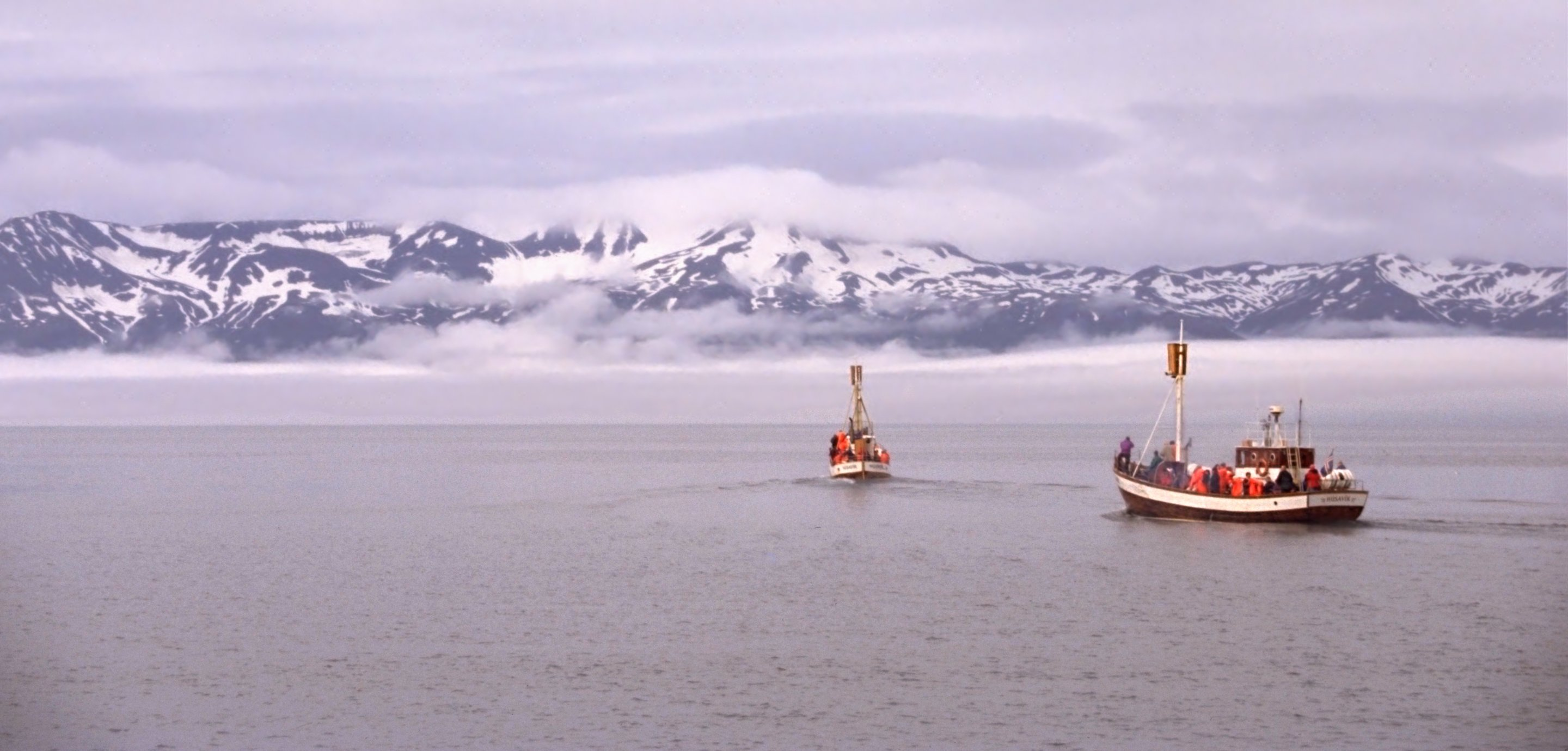
Whale watching ships in Skjálfandi

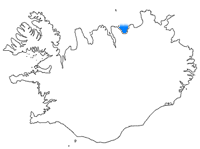
Location of Skjálfandi in Iceland

Skjálfandi (Icelandic pronunciation: [ˈscaulvantɪ]; also known as Skjálfandaflói [ˈscaulvantaˌflouːɪ]) is a bay in northern Iceland, with some of the characteristics of a fjord. The Icelandic word Skjálfandi literally translates to trembling which may refer to earthquakes in the area.

The bay, originally created by glacial activity, has two major rivers flowing into it: Skjálfandafljót, which is a glacier river, and Laxá, which is a freshwater river. The river Laxá [ˈlaksˌauː] ("Salmon River") is famous for its salmon and part of the river is protected by the Ramsar Convention.

The only town in Skjálfandi Bay is Húsavík, facing the snow-covered Víknafjöll [ˈvihknaˌfjœtl̥] and Kinnarfjöll [ˈcɪnːarˌfjœtl̥] mountain ranges on the other side of the bay. The highest point reaches around 1,200 metres (3,900 ft).

The bay is known for its many different whale, dolphin and bird species.

There are two islands in Skjálfandi. The larger one is Flatey (flat island). It is situated close to the opposite side of the bay from Húsavík. There is a village on the island, no longer inhabited, composed of a few houses, a school and a church. There is no ferry serving Flatey. Skjálfandi's smaller island is called Lundey. Its name means island of the puffins because of the great colony of puffins living on its cliffs during the summer. Lundey is located 8.3 kilometres (5.2 miles) north from Húsavík.

Garðar Svavarsson was one of the first Scandinavians to settle in Iceland, doing so around 860 CE. He built a house in Skjálfandi, but spent only the following winter months there before leaving Iceland. His slave Náttfari was left behind and continued to live on the farm but was chased away from it later by a Norse settler, forcing Náttfari to build a new farm on poorer land in Náttfaravík ([ˈnauhtˌfaːraˌviːk]; Old Norse: [ˈnɑːtːˌfɑrɑˌwiːk]) by Skjálfandi.

== Panorama ==
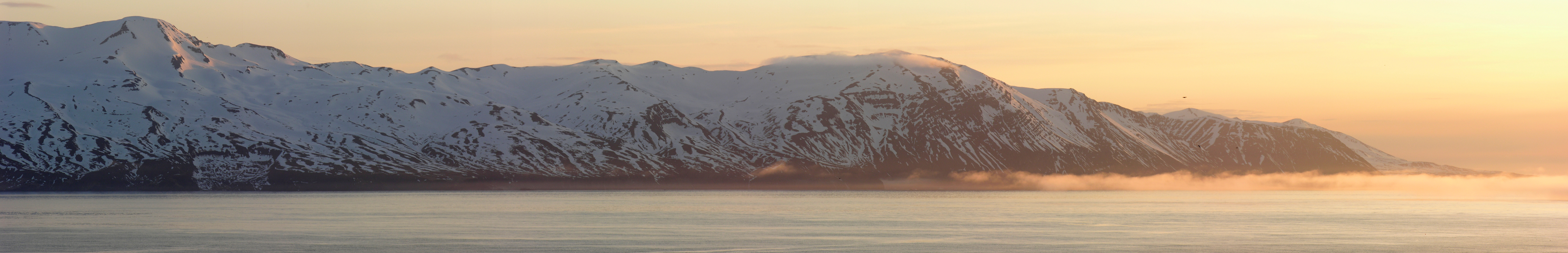
Panorama of Skjálfandi, May 2008

== See also ==
- Fjords of Iceland
