= Lundey, Faxaflói =

Island in Iceland

Coordinates: 64°11′14″N 21°49′50″W

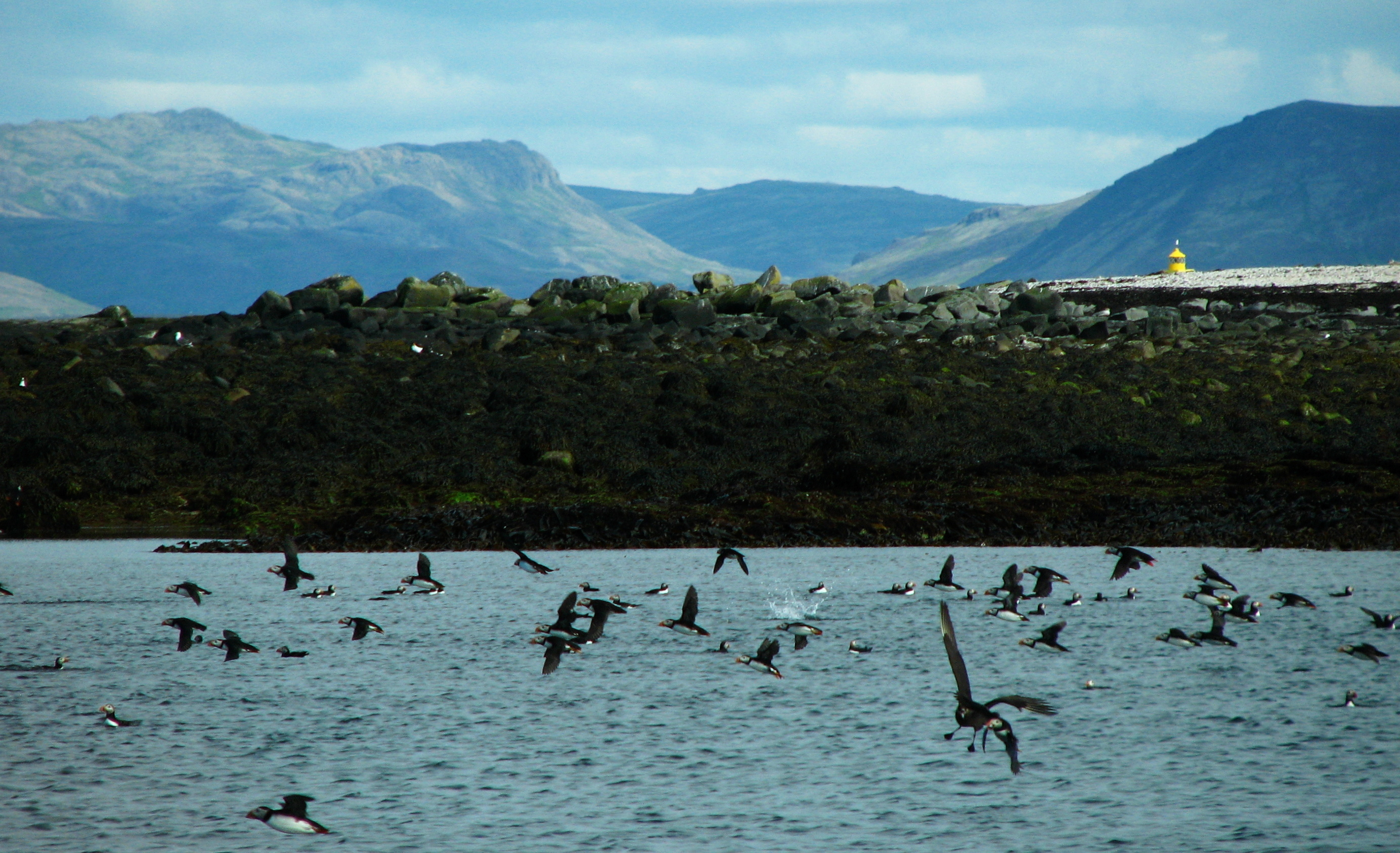
Lundey near Reykjavík

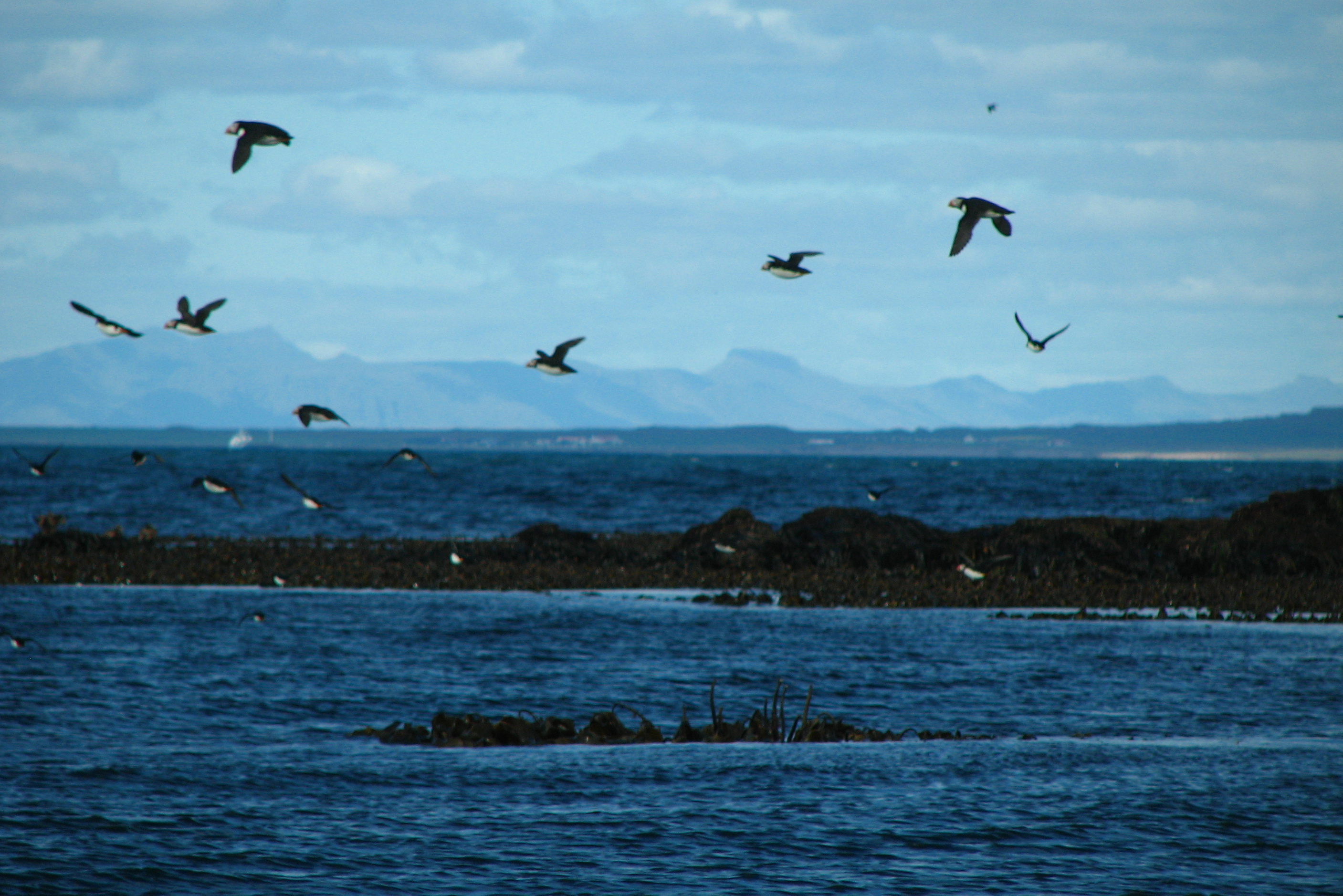
Lundey near Reykjavík

Lundey (Icelandic: [ˈlʏntˌeiː], "Puffin Island") is a small, uninhabited island off the western coast of Reykjavík, Iceland in Faxaflói Bay. There is one structure present on the island. Lundey lies less than 7 kilometres (4.3 mi) from the city center. It is about 400 metres (1,300 ft) long and 150 metres (490 ft) wide. Its highest point lies about 14 metres (46 ft) above sea level.

There are two other islands known as Lundey, both in northern Iceland; One in Skjálfandi Bay and another in Skagafjörður Fjord.

== Environment ==
The island serves as a haven for seabirds, including Atlantic puffins, black guillemots, fulmars and Arctic terns.
