= Vatnsfjörður =

Nature reserve in northwestern Iceland

Coordinates: 65°34′48″N 23°08′42″W

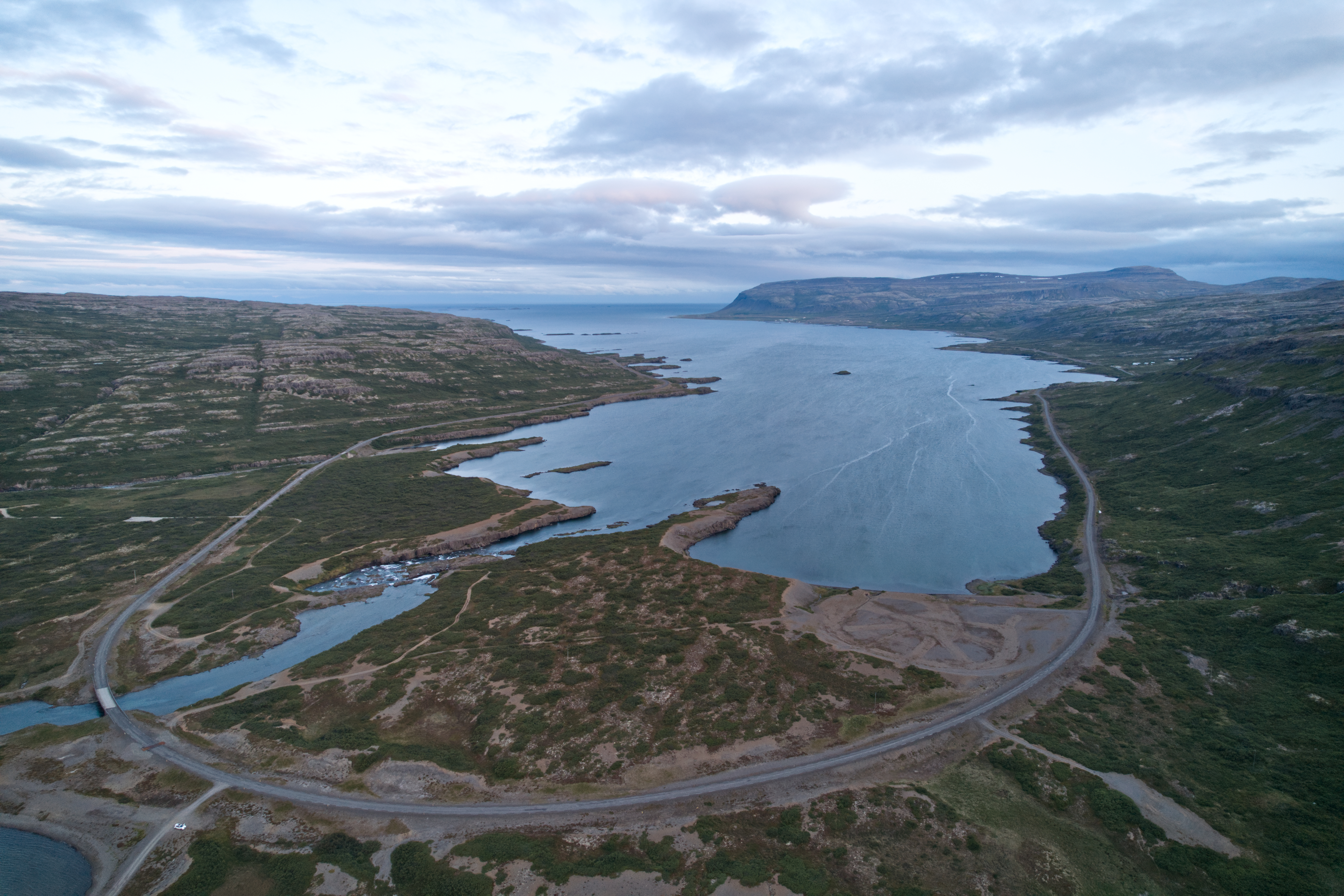
Vatnsfjörður.

Vatnsfjörður (Icelandic pronunciation: [ˈvassˌfjœrðʏr̥]) is a nature reserve located north-west of Breiðafjörður on the Hjarðarnes coast of northwestern Iceland.

== External links and sources ==
- The Environment Agency of Iceland (Umhverfisstofnun): Vatnsfjörður
