= Garðar Svavarsson =

Swedish explorer

Garðarr Svavarsson (Old Norse: [ˈɡɑrðˌɑrː ˈswɑwɑrsˌson]; Modern Icelandic: Garðar Svavarsson [ˈkarðˌaːr ˈsvaːvar̥sˌsɔːn]; Modern Swedish: Gardar Svavarsson) was a Swede who briefly resided in Iceland, according to the Sagas. He is said to be the second Scandinavian to reach the island of Iceland after Naddodd. He and his family appear in the Icelandic Sagas with the principal source from Haukr Erlendsson's edition of Landnámabók.

== Biography ==
Svavarsson is described as a Swedish Viking who owned land in Zealand (in modern Denmark). He was married to a woman from the Hebrides. During the 860s, he needed to claim his inheritance from his father-in-law. During a voyage to these isles, he sailed into a storm at Pentland Firth. This storm pushed his ship far to the north until he reached the eastern coast of Iceland. He circumnavigated the island, becoming the first known person to do so and thus establishing that the landmass was an island. He went ashore at Skjálfandi where he built himself a house and stayed for the winter. Since then, the place located in North Eastern Iceland has been called Húsavík.

Having returned, he praised the new land and called it after his own name Garðarshólmi (see names of Iceland). Nothing is known of his fate thereafter, but his son, Uni danski (Uni the Dane), later emigrated to Iceland. He made a feeble attempt to win it for the Norwegian king with himself as earl. He had discussed this with the king but when the local farmers knew his intent, they would help him in no way and soon he was killed.

Uni danski had a son, Hróar Tungugoði, who inherited the entire estate. In the Sagas of Icelanders, Hróar quarreled with other men and was twice challenged to a hill battle and won both times. He killed his opponents but was eventually murdered but then avenged by his son. Hróar's wife was Arngunnur, sister of Gunnar Hámundarson, who is one of the main characters in Njáls saga, the longest and generally considered the greatest of the Icelandic Sagas.

== See also ==
- Náttfari

== Other sources ==
- Sigurðsson, Jón (1968) Garðar og náttfari (Reykjavík: Leiftur)
