= Akurey =

Island in Iceland

Coordinates: 64°10′19″N 21°57′42″W

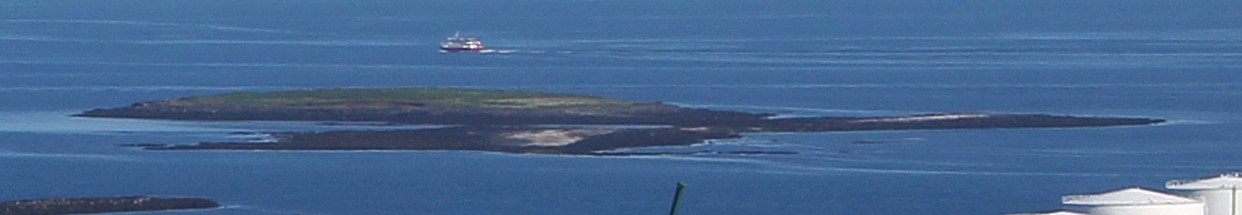
View of Akurey from Hallgrímskirkja

Akurey (Icelandic pronunciation: [ˈaːkʏrˌeiː]) is a small, uninhabited island near the coast of Reykjavík. The earliest sources on the island are from 1379 when it belonged to the Víkurkirkja. The city of Reykjavík bought the island in 1969 and has leased it out. In 1978 it was incorporated into the municipality of Reykjavík.

In 2019, Akurey was declared a protected nature reserve.
