= Heimaey =

Island in iceland

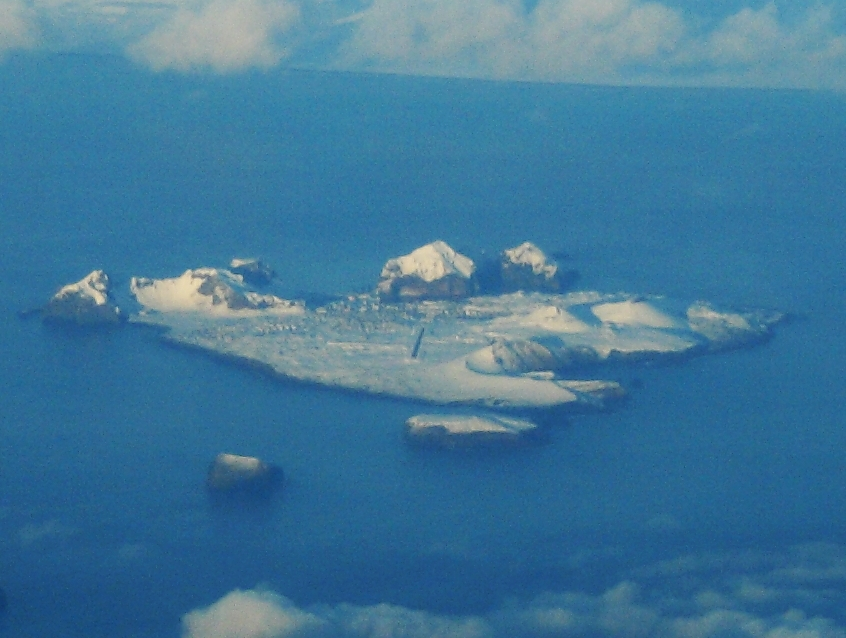
- Heimaey in February 2009. Looking north-east

Geography
- Location: Iceland
- Coordinates: 63°26′N 20°16′W
- Archipelago: Vestmannaeyjar
- Area: 13.4 km^{2} (5.2 sq mi)
- Highest elevation: 200 m (700 ft)
- Highest point: Heimaklettur

Administration
- Iceland

Demographics
- Population: 4,639 (2024)
- Pop. density: 250.82/km^{2} (649.62/sq mi)

Heimaey off southwest Iceland

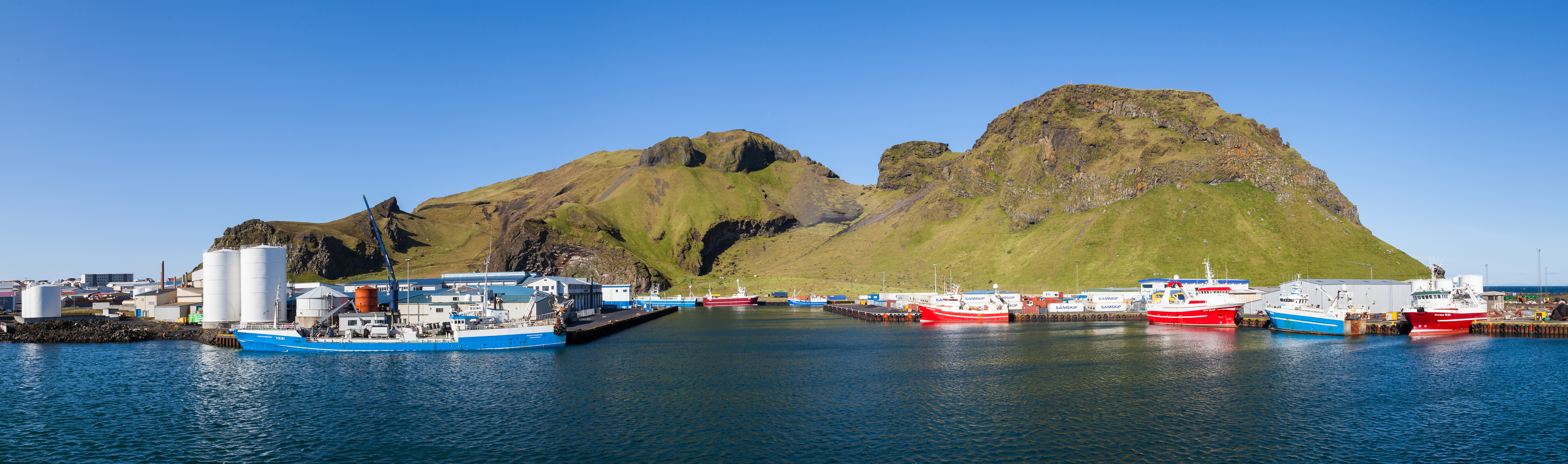
Heimaey harbour in 2014

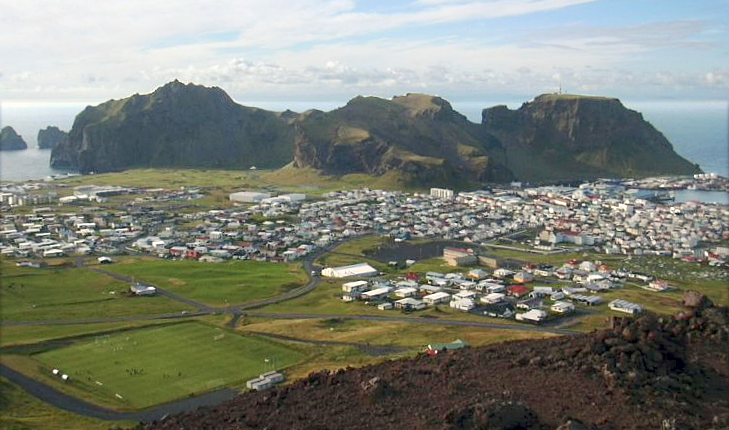
View from the Helgafell, looking north-west

Heimaey (Icelandic pronunciation: [ˈheiːmaˌeiː]), is an Icelandic island. At 13.4 square kilometres (5.2 mi^{2}), it is the largest island in the Vestmannaeyjar archipelago, and the largest and most populated island off the Icelandic coast. Heimaey is 4 nautical miles (7.4 km; 4.6 mi) off the south coast of Iceland. It is the only populated island of the Vestmannaeyjar islands, with a population of 4,414 in 2022. The Vestmannaeyjar Airport and the Westman Islands Golf Club taken together cover a good portion of the island.

In January 1973, lava flow from nearby Eldfell destroyed half the town and threatened to close its harbour, its main income source. An operation to cool the advancing lava with sea water saved the harbour.

== History ==
=== First settlers ===
In tradition, Herjólfur Bárðarson was said to be the first person to settle in Heimaey. According to the Landnáma, he built his farm in Herjólfsdalur (literally: Herjólf's valley) about 900. The archaeological excavation in 1971 of ancient ruins in Herjólfsdalur revealed that there had been settlement nearly 100 years earlier.

=== Arab pirate ships raid ===
In 1627, three Arab pirate ships from the Ottoman Empire-controlled Barbary Coast, what is now Morocco and Algeria, raided several towns on the south coast of Iceland and outlying islands. They attacked Grindavík and Heimaey. In Grindavík, townspeople could flee into the lava field of Reykjanes and hide indefinitely.

Heimaey was so isolated that it was vulnerable and people suffered. The Arab pirates killed or kidnapped--and sent to Algeria--almost half of the people of Heimaey. They burned down the island's church, killed one of its pastors, and kidnapped the other pastor.

Heroic stories were told of the people who survived the invasion, most notably Guðríður Símonardóttir. Better known as Tyrkja-Gudda (Turkish-Gudda), she was kidnapped and taken by the pirates from her home at Stakkagerði on Heimaey to the slave market in Algeria, where she was sold as a slave and concubine. She was ransomed back to Denmark a decade later by King Christian IV of Denmark and was re-educated ("re-Christianized") by and later married the poet Hallgrímur Pétursson. The Hallgrímskirkja Lutheran church in Reykjavík is named in his honour.

== Eldfell ==
Sketch showing the changes to Heimaey caused by the eruption of Eldfell

On 23 January 1973, a volcanic eruption of the mountain Eldfell began on Heimaey. The ground started to quake and fissures formed and began to erupt. When the fissures closed, the eruption converted to a concentrated lava flow that headed toward the harbour. Half a million cubic metres of ash blew on the town. During the night, the 5,000 inhabitants of the island were evacuated, mostly by fishing boats.

The encroaching lava flow threatened to destroy the harbour. The eruption lasted until 3 July. Icelanders sprayed the lava with six million tons of cold seawater, causing some to solidify and much to be diverted, thus saving the harbour. During the eruption, half of the town was crushed and the island expanded in length. The eruption increased the area of Heimaey from 11.2 km^{2} (4.3 mi^{2}) to 13.44 km^{2} (5.19 mi^{2}). Only one man died in the eruption. The eruption is described by John McPhee in his book The Control of Nature.

== Present day ==
Heimaey was home as of 2004 to around 4,500 people, and eight million puffins every summer. The island is connected to the rest of Iceland by a ferry and Vestmannaeyjar Airport.

== In popular culture ==
- Some final shots of Chris Marker's film Sans Soleil are of stark white Heimaey houses.
- Heimaey is mentioned in the song "Island" by American progressive-metal band Mastodon.
- Ashes to Dust by Yrsa Sigurðardóttir (2007, English Translation 2011), the third of her murder mysteries set in Iceland, is largely set on Heimaey.
- The 1973 album Sumut by Greenlandic rock band Sumé features a song called "Heimaey erĸaivdlugo" (English: "Ode to Heimaey").

== Gallery ==
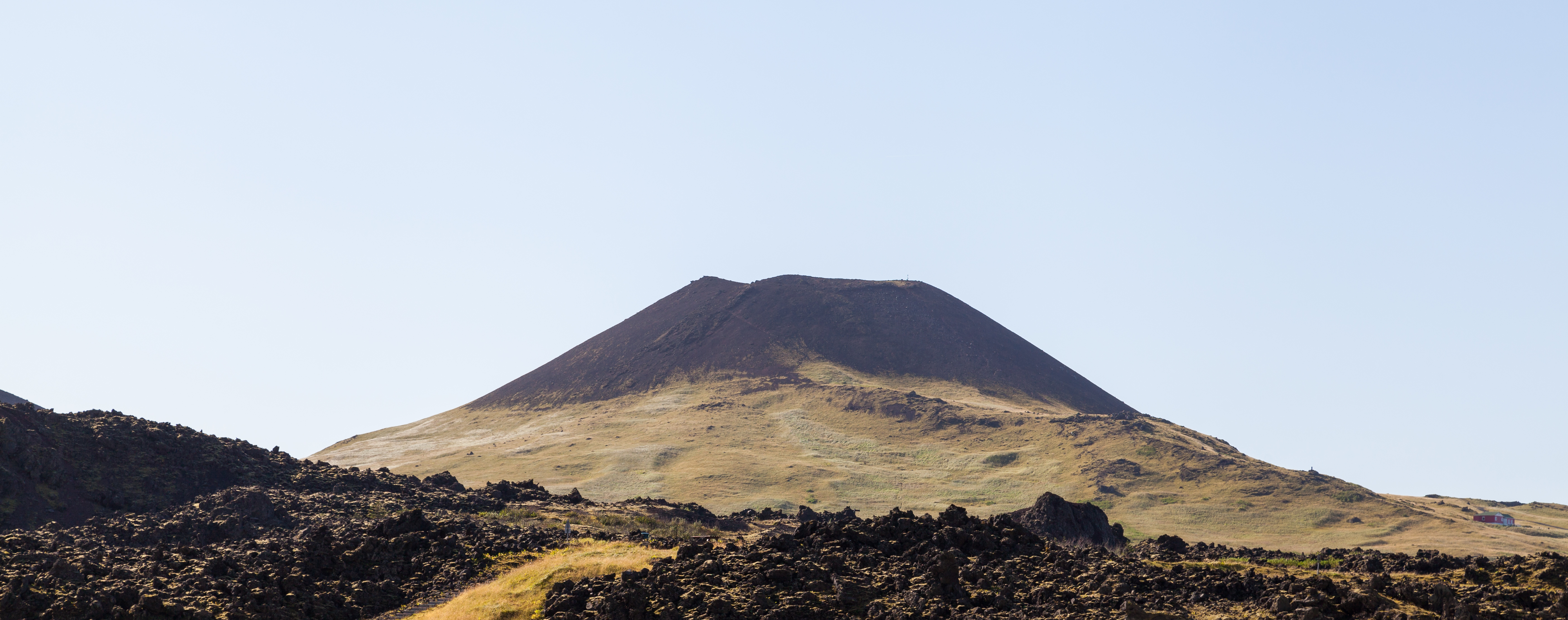
Helgafell volcano

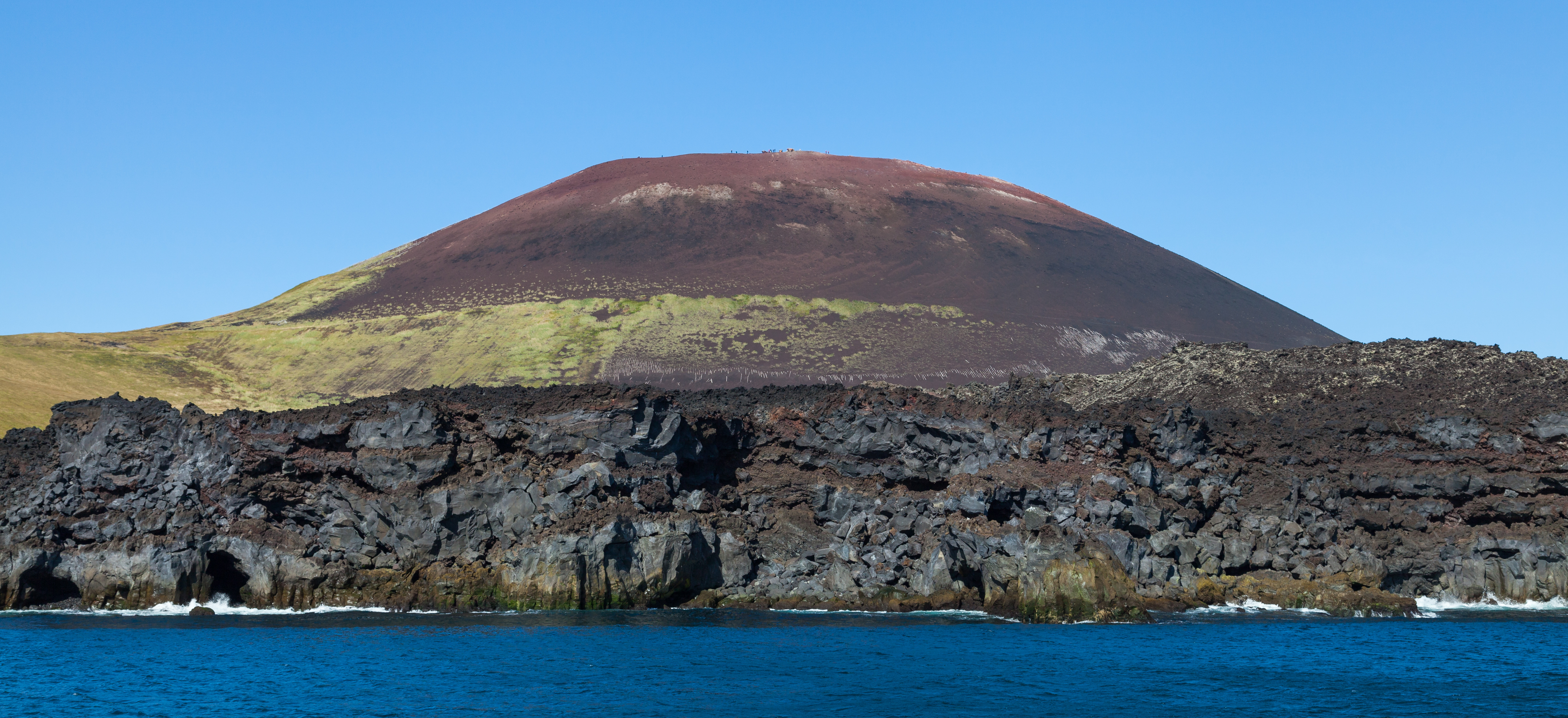
Eldfell volcano

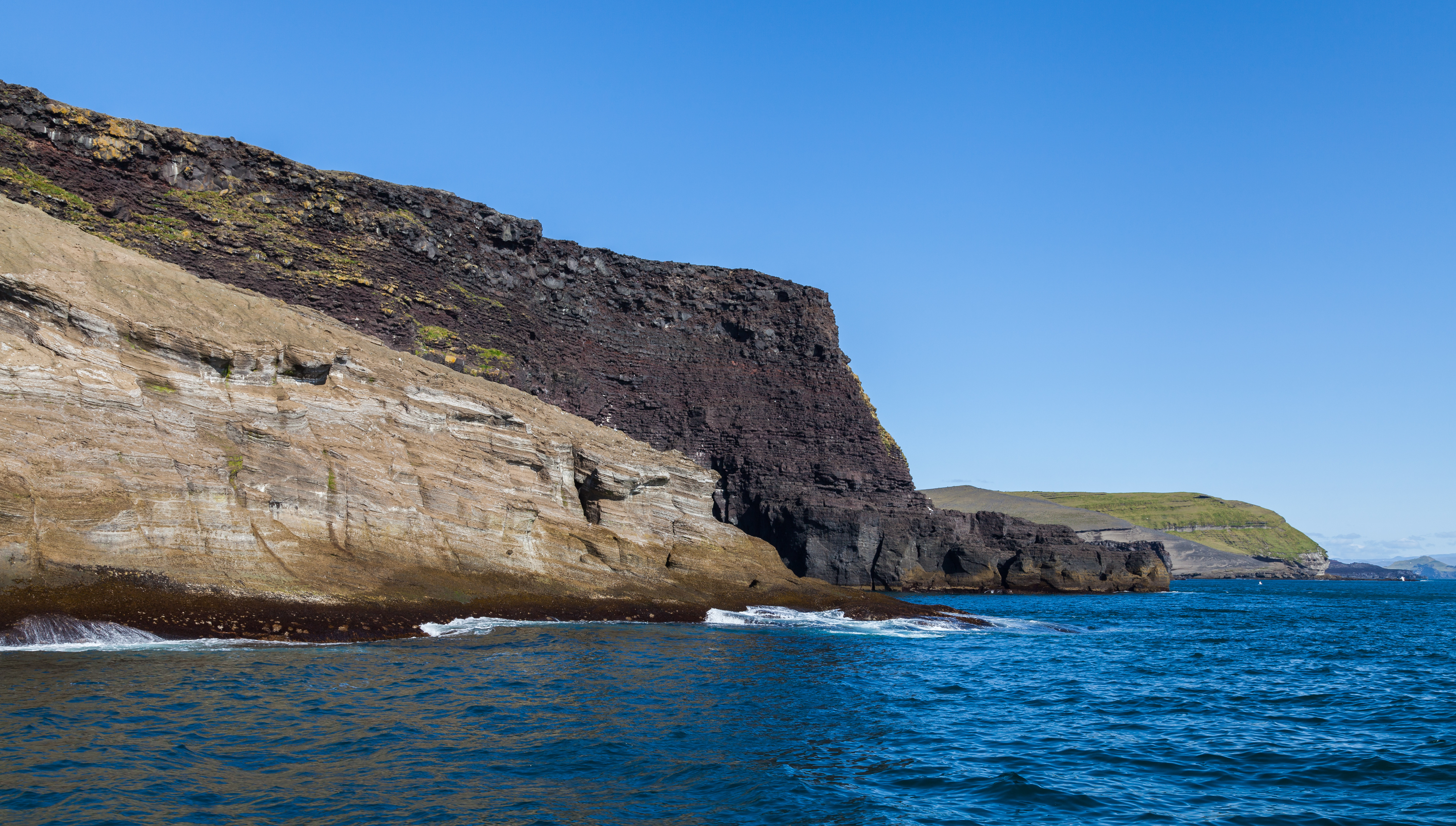
View of the island

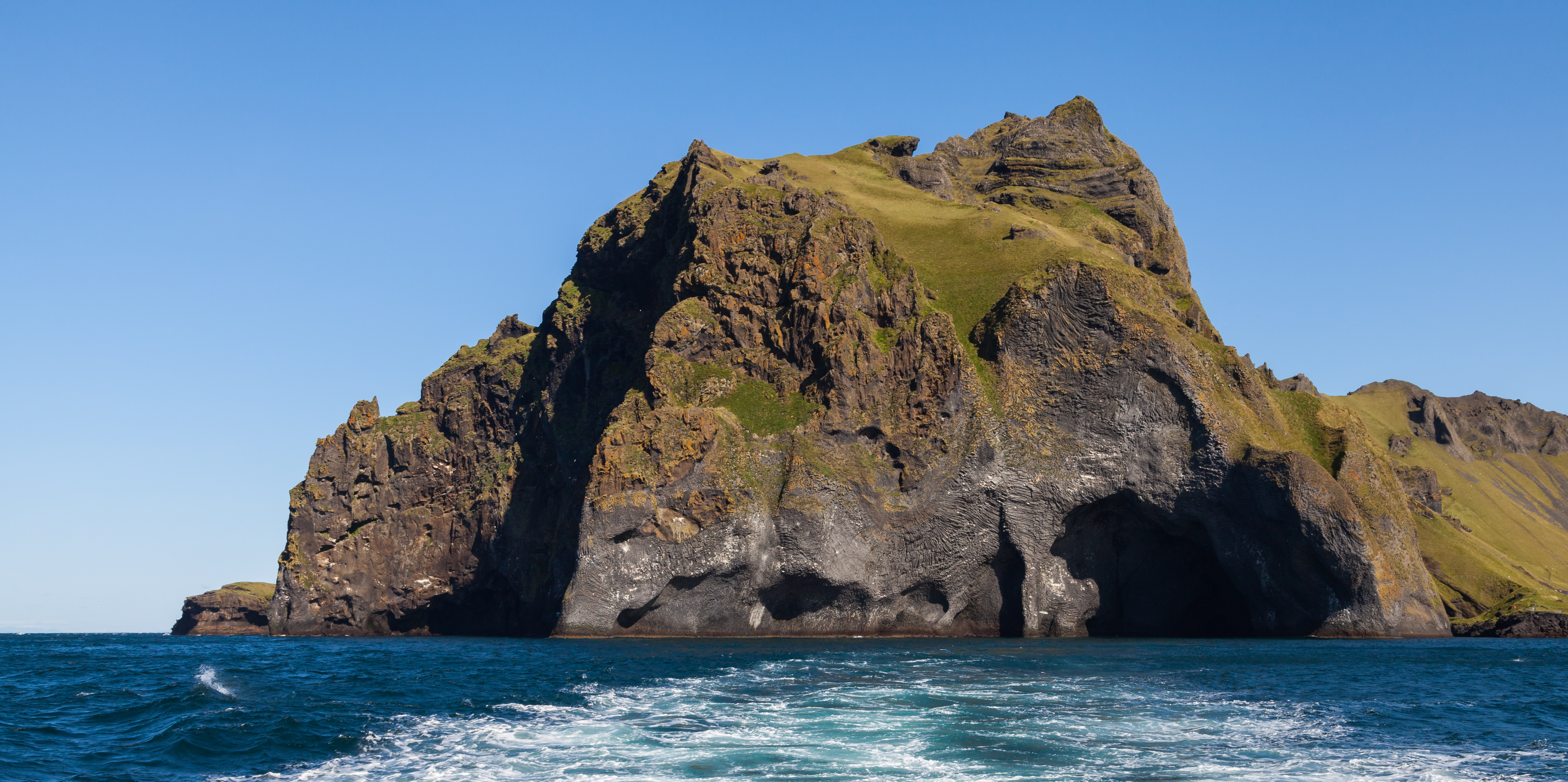
View of the island

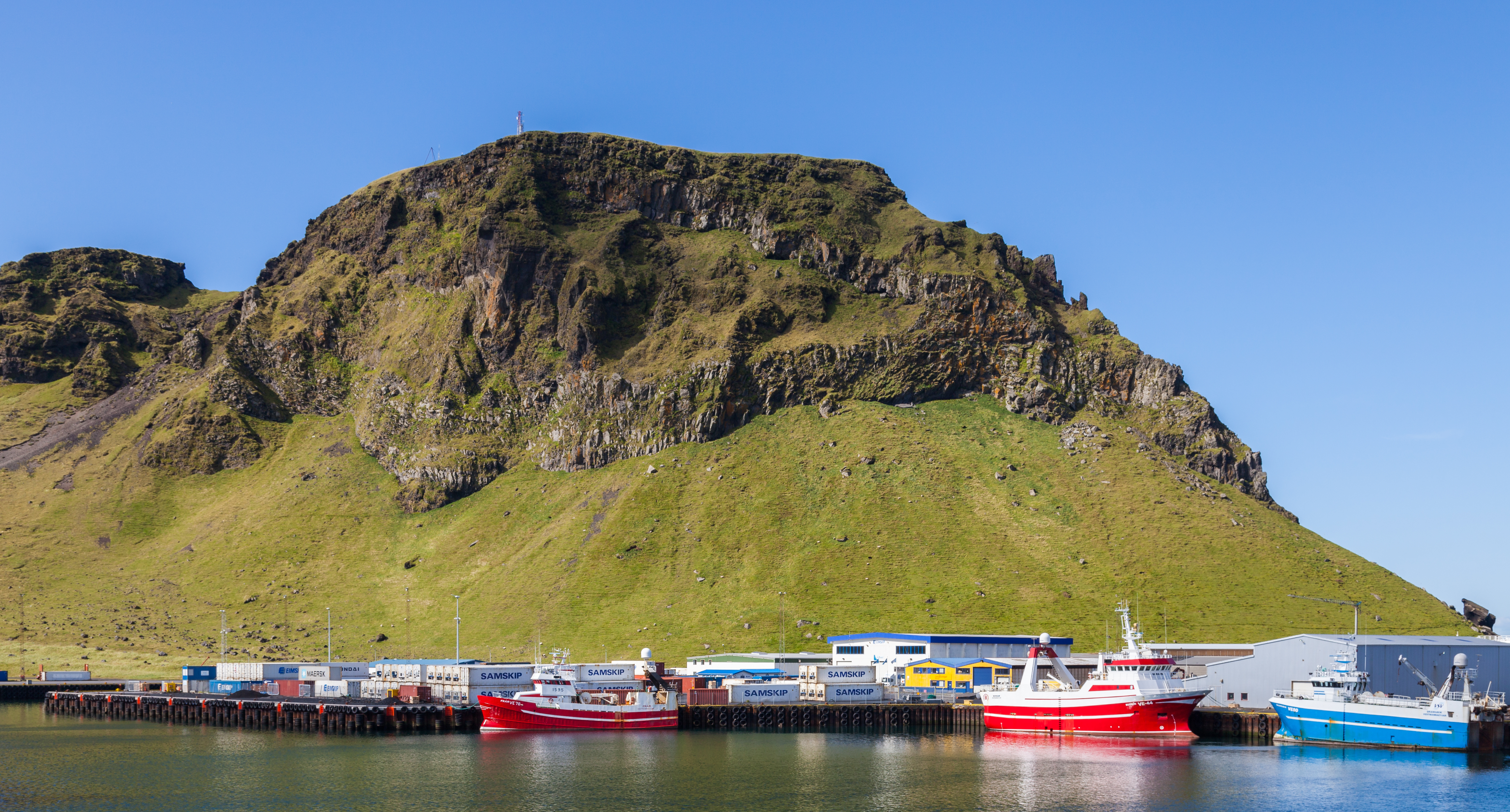
Vestmannaeyjar harbour in Heimaey
