= Pierre de Provence =

Pierre de Provence is a medieval French chivalric romance.

== Summary ==
Count Peter of Provence leaves home in search of the reputedly beautiful Magelone, daughter of the King of Naples. He meets her, they fall in love, and they elope. But the two are separated by ill fortune and Peter becomes infatuated with a Muslim woman, Sulima. Peter and Magelone are eventually reunited and live happily ever after.

== Circulations and adaptations ==
The tale appeared in print in French in 1453 as Pierre de Provence et la belle Maguelone. A German translation by Veit Warbeck appeared as a Volksbuch (chapbook) in 1527; this was adapted in 1535 as Die Schön Magelona, which was in turn adapted by Ludwig Tieck as Liebesgeschichte der schönen Magelone und des Grafen Peter von Provence, published in 1797.

Drawing on earlier Icelandic renderings, German, and/or Danish versions, Hallgrímur Pétursson adapted the story as Rímur af Lykla-Pétri og Magelónu, using the rímur form of Icelandic narrative verse, around the 1630s.
