= Egilsson =

Egilsson is a surname. Notable people with the surname include:

- Eagle Egilsson (born 1966), Icelandic television director and cinematographer
- Ólafur Egilsson (1564–1639), Icelandic priest
- Sveinbjörn Egilsson (1791–1852), Icelandic theologian, classicist, teacher, translator, and poet
