= Gook (disambiguation) =

Gook is an ethnic slur primarily, but not exclusively, referring to Asians.

Gook or GOOK may also refer to:

== People ==
- Arthur Charles Gook (1883–1959), English evangelical Christian, writer and translator
- Bert Gook (c. 1914–1964), Australian rules footballer
- Roosevelt Gook, a pseudonym for Al Kooper (born Alan Peter Kuperschmidt in 1944), American songwriter, record producer and musician

== Other uses ==
- Gook (headgear), worn by women mining manual labourers in Cornwall and Devon
- Gook (film), a 2017 American drama about two Korean-American brothers
- "Gook", a song by Denzel Curry from Imperial
- Kang Gook, a main character in Ireland, a 2004 South Korean television series
- Gook Creek, Michigan, United States
- GOOK, ICAO airport code for Kaolack Airport, Kaolack, Senegal

== See also ==
- Guk, a class of soup-like dishes in Korean cuisine
