= Liebesgeschichte der schönen Magelone und des Grafen Peter von Provence =

Liebesgeschichte der schönen Magelone und des Grafen Peter von Provence (Love-Story of the Beautiful Magelone and Count Peter of Provence) is an eighteen-section German narrative in alternating prose and verse, with prose and one poem per section, by Ludwig Tieck.

Published in 1797, it relates an anonymous Occitan tale, Pierre de Provence, dating back to at least the 13th century. Count Peter of Provence leaves home in search of the reputedly beautiful Magelone, daughter of the King of Naples. He meets her, they fall in love, and they elope. But the two are separated by ill fortune and Peter becomes infatuated with a Muslim woman, Sulima. Peter and Magelone are eventually reunited and live happily ever after.

The tale was expressed in print in French in 1453 (Pierre de Provence et la belle Maguelone) and in German in 1535 (Die Schön Magelona [sic]). The latter, which served as Tieck’s immediate source, resulted from a 1527 translation by Veit Warbeck issued after Warbeck’s death as a chapbook, or Volksbuch.

Tieck’s narrative appeared in a three-volume collection of tales and dramas: Volksmärchen herausgegeben von Peter Lebrecht (Folk-Tales edited by Peter Lebrecht). In 1802 and 1803, Tieck worked on a drama based on the tale but completed only a short prologue in verse. Later, in 1811, Die schöne Magelone also appeared as a tale in his Phantasus. Furthermore sixteen of the eighteen poems were published separately as a lyric cycle, Des Jünglings Liebe (Of the Young Man’s Love).

Between 1861 and 1869 Johannes Brahms set to music fifteen of Tieck’s eighteen poems, scoring them for voice with piano accompaniment. These were published as the composer’s Opus 33 in five volumes of three songs each in 1865 and 1869: Romanzen aus L. Tieck’s Magelone für eine Singstimme mit Pianoforte [sic].

== Timeline ==
1453 Anonymous French roman en prose appears
c. 1470 Anonymous German translation appears
1527 Veit Warbeck completes his translation in manuscript form
1535 Warbeck’s translation is published posthumously as a Volksbuch
under the title Die sehr lustige Histori vonn der schönen Magelona ... und von einem Ritter genannt Peter mit den silberin schlüsseln.
1796 Tieck adapts Warbeck's version as Liebesgeschichte der schönen Magelone und des Grafen Peter aus der Provence
1797 Tieck publishes Volksmärchen herausgegeben von Peter Lebrecht, which includes The Fair Magelone
1811 Tieck publishes the first part of Phantasus, which includes a revised version of The Fair Magelone under its present title
1836-37 Gustav Schwab includes another version of the tale in his series of Deutsche Volksbücher (German Chapbooks)
1845-66 Karl Simrock includes The Fair Magelone in his series of Deutsche Volksbücher
1861-69 Johannes Brahms sets fifteen of Tieck's Magelone lyrics to music
1912 Peter Jerusalem includes Warbeck's version of The Fair Magelone in a volume of Deutsche Volksbücher
