= Eldfell =

Volcanic cone in Heimaey, Iceland

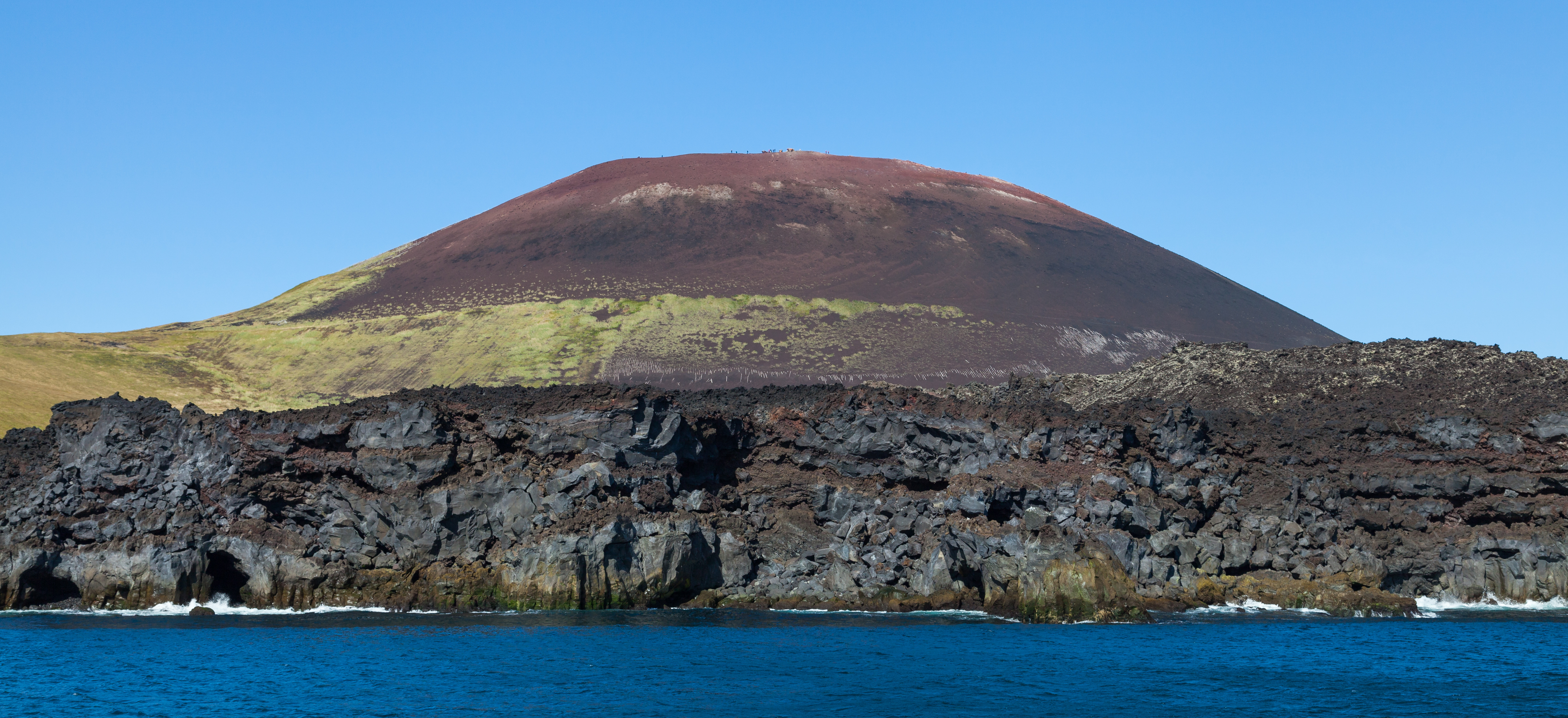
- Eldfell, August 2014

Highest point
- Elevation: 200 m (660 ft)
- Prominence: 200 m (660 ft)
- Coordinates: 63°25′57″N 20°14′51″W

Geography
- Location within Iceland
- Location: Heimaey island, Vestmannaeyjar, Iceland

Geology
- Rock age: Historical
- Mountain type: Volcanic cone
- Volcanic zone: South Iceland Volcanic Zone (SIVZ)
- Last eruption: January to June 1973

Eldfell is a volcanic cone just over 200 metres (660 ft) high on the Icelandic island of Heimaey in the Westman Islands. It formed in a volcanic eruption that began without warning on the eastern side of Heimaey on 23 January 1973. The name means Hill of Fire in Icelandic.

The eruption caused a major crisis for the island and led to its temporary evacuation. Volcanic ash fell over most of the island, destroying around 400 homes, and a lava flow threatened to close off the harbor, the island's main income source via its fishing fleet. An operation was mounted to cool the advancing lava flow by pumping sea water onto it, which was successful in preventing the loss of the harbor.

After the eruption, the islanders used heat from the cooling lava flows to provide hot water and to generate electricity. They also used some of the extensive tephra (fall-out of airborne volcanic material) to extend the runway at the island's small airport and as landfill on which 200 new houses were built.

== Background ==
Iceland is a region of frequent volcanic activity, due to its location astride the Mid-Atlantic Ridge, where the North American and Eurasian Plates are moving apart, and also over the Iceland hotspot, which greatly enhances the volcanic activity. It is estimated that a third of all the basaltic lava erupted in the world in recorded history has been produced by Icelandic eruptions.

Map of Heimaey after the eruption of Eldfell in January 1973

The Vestmannaeyjar (Westman Islands) archipelago lies off the south coast of Iceland, and consists of several small islands, all formed by eruptions in the Holocene epoch. Heimaey, the largest island in the group and the only inhabited one, also contains some material from the Pleistocene era. The most prominent feature on Heimaey before 1973 was Helgafell, a 200 meters (650 ft) high volcanic cone formed in an eruption about 5,000 years ago.

The Vestmannaeyjar archipelago was settled in about 874 AD, originally by escaped Insular slaves belonging to Norse settlers on the mainland. These settlers gave the islands their name, Britain and Ireland being west of mainland Scandinavia. Although plagued by poor water supplies and piracy during much of its history, Heimaey became the most important center of the Icelandic fishing industry, having one of the few good harbors on the southern side of the country, and being situated in very rich fishing grounds.

== Eruption ==
At about 20:00 on 21 January 1973, a series of small tremors began to occur around Heimaey. They were too weak to be felt by the residents of the island, but a seismic station 60 kilometres (37 mi) away, near the mainland, recorded over 100 large tremors between 01:00 and 03:00 on 22 January that appeared to be emanating from south of Heimaey. The tremors continued at a reduced rate until 11:00 that day, after which they stopped until 23:00 that evening. From 23:00 until 01:34 on 23 January, seven tremors were detected that grew shallower and more intense, while the epicenter moved closer to the town of Vestmannaeyjar. The largest tremor measured 2.7 on the Richter scale.

Small tremors are very common at plate boundaries, and nothing here indicated that they heralded a major eruption. The onset of the eruption was therefore almost entirely unexpected. At about 01:55 on 23 January, a fissure opened up on the eastern side of the island, barely a kilometre away from the centre of the town of Heimaey, approximately 200 metres (650 ft) east of Kirkjubær (Church farm), where the island's church had once been located.

The fissure rapidly extended from 300 metres to a length of 2 kilometres (1.2 mi), crossing the island from one shore to the other. Submarine activity also occurred just offshore at the northern and southern ends of the fissure. Spectacular lava fountaining 50 to 150 metres high occurred along the whole fissure, which reached a maximum length of about 3 kilometres (1.9 mi) during the first few hours of the eruption, but activity soon became concentrated on one vent, about 0.8-kilometre (0.50 mi) north of the old volcanic cone of Helgafell and just outside the eastern edge of the town.

During the early days of the eruption, the rate of lava and tephra emission from the fissure was estimated to be 100 cubic metres per second (3,500 cubic feet per second), and within two days, the lava fountains had built a cinder cone over 100 metres (330 ft) high. The name initially given to the new volcano was Kirkjufell (Church Mountain), owing to its proximity to Kirkjubær. This name was not adopted by the official Icelandic place-naming committee, who chose Eldfell (Fire Mountain) instead, despite local opposition. The fountains' Strombolian eruptions continued until 19 February, depositing thick tephra over the northern half of the island and adding to the cone until it was 200 metres (660 ft) high. The eruption column that caused the air fall "occasionally rose to 9,000 metres (30,000 ft), or nearly to the tropopause". Lava flows from the cone traveled north and east to produce a "continuously expanding lava delta" along the east coast of the island and into the harbor, where small explosions built up a diminutive island that was soon overtaken by the advancing delta.

The first lavas erupted by Eldfell had a mugearitic chemical composition but within a few weeks the volcano was erupting less fractionated lavas which had a hawaiitic composition.

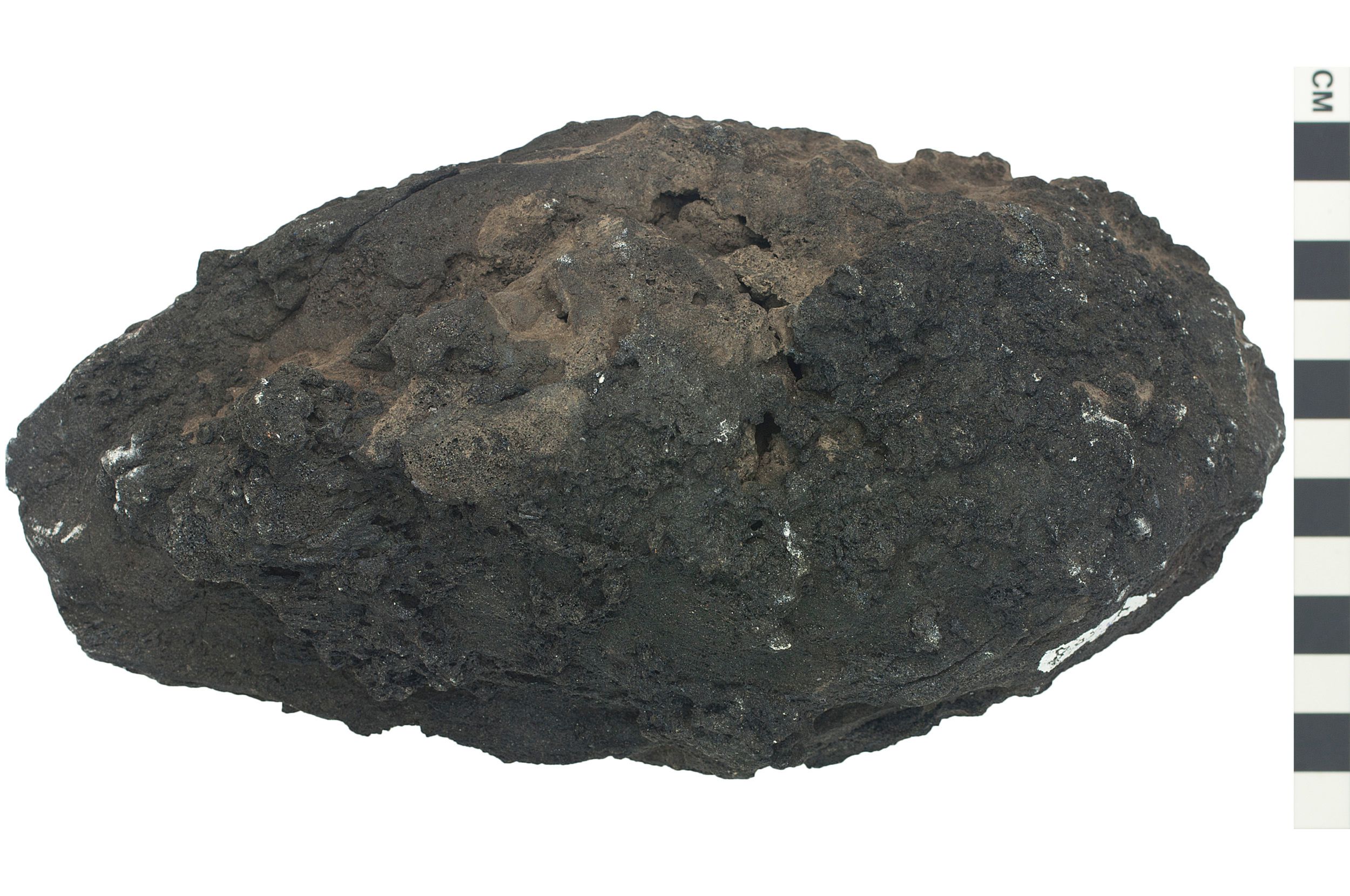
Basalt volcanic bomb from Eldfell

By early May, the lava flow was between 9.1 and 21.0 m (10 and 23 yd) in height. It averaged more than 37 m (40 yd) and in some places was as much as 100 m (110 yd) thick. The flow carried off large blocks from the main cone that had broken off, as well as volcanic bombs. "The viscosity of the lava fragments ejected by the blasts was, for basalt, relatively high. Very little spatter was produced and scoria bombs sometimes broke up explosively in flight (presumably due to rapid vesiculation), and by rapid impact on landing." The high viscosity led to a "massive, blocky ʻaʻā lava flow which moved slowly but relentlessly toward the north, northeast, and east."

Volcanic gases were collected from several locations. Gases collected at sea along the submerged part of active eruptive fissure were dominantly carbon dioxide and gases from cooling submerged lava flows were about 70 percent hydrogen. (Richard & James, 1983) Poisonous gas was found at low areas on the eastern part of Vestmannaeyjar. A wall was constructed between the vent and town to divert the gas, and a long trench was excavated for the steam to escape. However, none of these measures were completely effective. (Richard & James, 1983)

== Evacuation ==
In the early hours of the eruption, the Icelandic State Civil Defence Organisation evacuated the entire population of Heimaey, having previously developed evacuation plans for an emergency such as this. The evacuation was necessary because lava flows were already moving slowly into the eastern side of town, and the whole of the small island was threatened by the likelihood of heavy ash fall.

Because of severe storms in the days before the eruption, almost the entire fishing fleet was in the harbor, a stroke of luck which greatly assisted the organisation of the rapid evacuation. The population was alerted to the situation by fire engines sounding their sirens, and gathered by the harbor with just the small amount of possessions they were able to carry. The first boats left for Þorlákshöfn at about 02:30, just half an hour after the start of the eruption.

Most of the population left the island by boat. Fortunately, the lava flows and tephra fall did not at first affect the island's airstrip (Vestmannaeyjar Airport), and a few people who were unable to travel by boat were evacuated by air—primarily the elderly and patients from the hospital. Planes were sent from Reykjavík and Keflavik to help speed the process. Within six hours of the onset of the eruption, almost all of the 5,300 people of the island were safely on the mainland. A few people remained to carry out essential functions and to salvage belongings from threatened houses. Cattle, horses and sheep on the island were slaughtered. On the mainland, friends, relatives and strangers offered shelter and housing. By the end of the day, all 5,300 people were spread around cities and towns on the mainland.

== Destruction of houses, creation of land ==
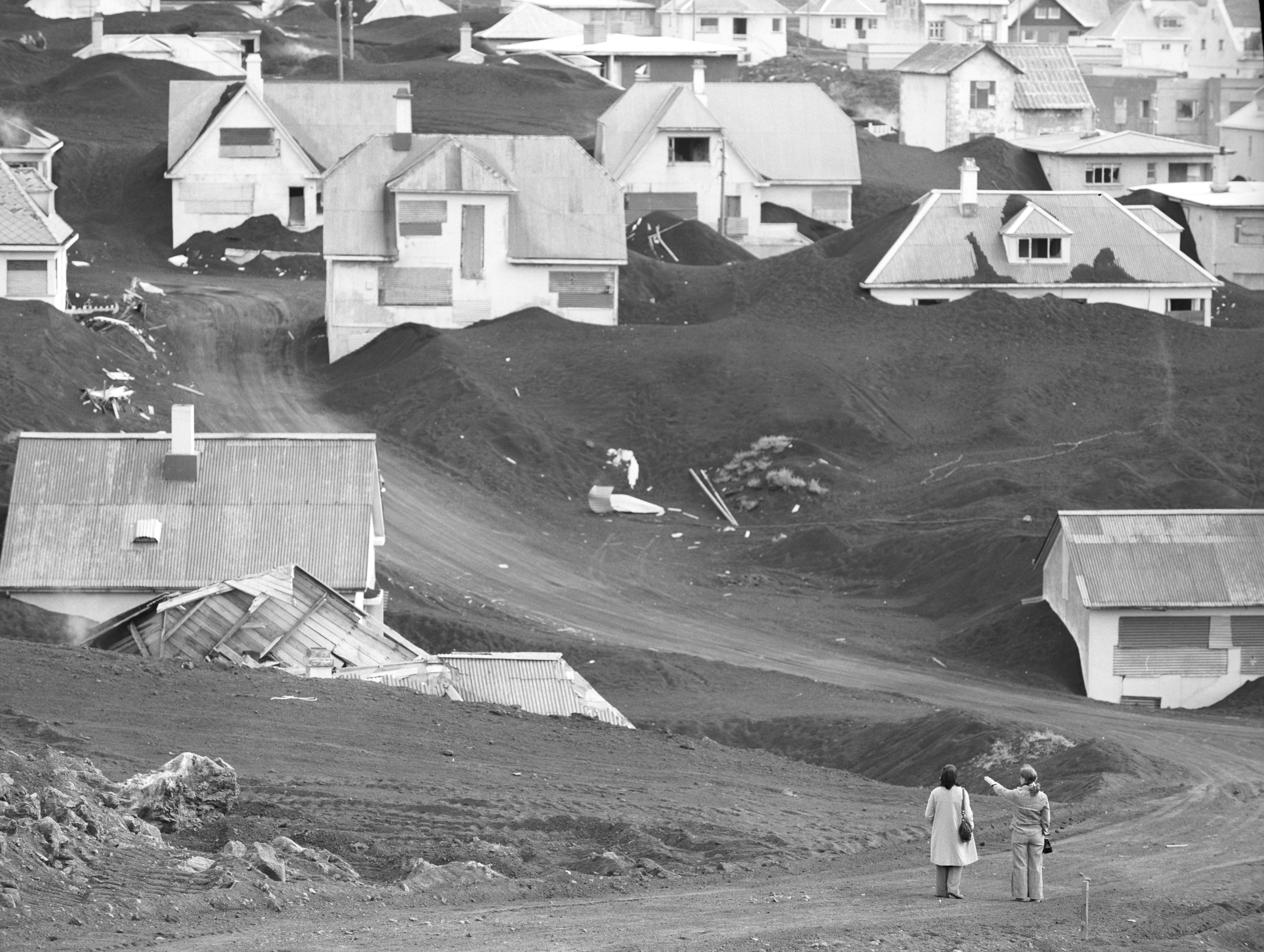
Houses buried by ash

Houses close to the rift were soon destroyed by lava flows and tephra fall. A few days after the eruption began, the prevailing wind direction moved to the west, resulting in extensive tephra falls over the rest of the island, causing extensive property damage. Many houses were destroyed by the weight of the ash fall, but crews of volunteers working to clear the ash from roofs and board up windows saved many more. By the end of January, tephra covered most of the island, reaching 5 metres (16 ft) deep in places. Apart from falling ash, some houses were also burned down by fires caused by lava bombs, or overridden by advancing lava flows.

By early February, the heavy tephra fall had abated, but lava flows began to cause serious damage. Submarine activity just north of the fissure severed an electric power cable and a water pipeline which supplied electrical power and water from the Icelandic mainland, and lava began to flow towards the harbor, a situation which caused serious concerns – if the harbor was blocked, the island's fishing industry would be devastated. By early May, about 300 buildings had been engulfed by lava flows or gutted by fire and 60-70 homes had been buried by tephra.(Richard & James, 1983) As Heimaey was responsible for some 3% of Iceland's GNP, the effect on the whole country's economy would be significant. Efforts to prevent the loss of the harbor are described further below.

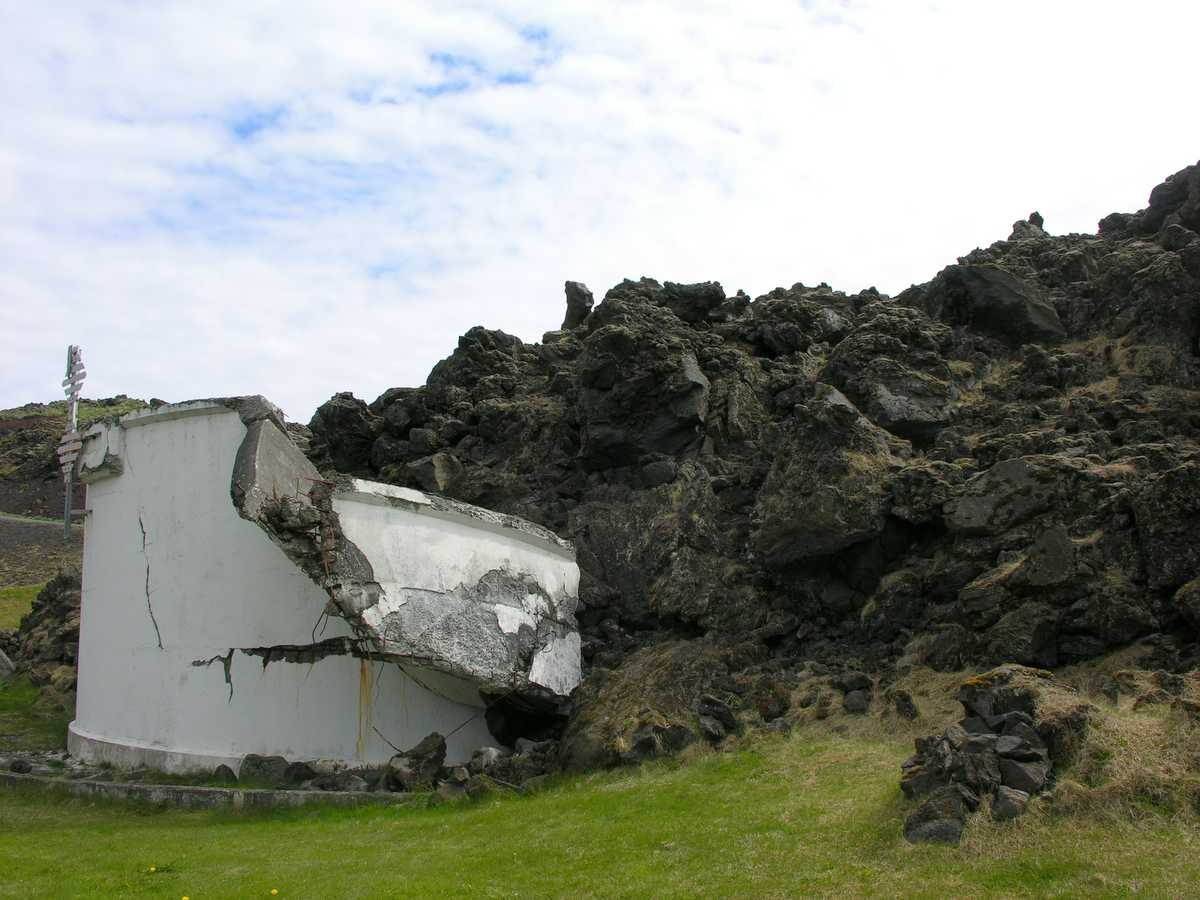
A concrete water tank, partly crushed by lava

Lava flows also moved into the sea east of the island, creating new land that would eventually add over two square kilometres (3/4 sq mi) to the island, and into the eastern parts of town, destroying several hundred houses. The flows were thick and blocky ʻaʻā lava (Icelandic: apalhraun) flows, and covered the ground to average depths of about 40 metre (130 ft), reaching 100 metre (330 ft) thick in places. Later on in the eruption, a surge of lava destroyed one fish processing plant and damaged two others, and also demolished the town's power generating plant.

Despite the eruption's close proximity to the town and the extensive property damage, only one fatality could be attributed to the eruption, a man who died from CO_{2} (carbon dioxide) poisoning after entering a cellar. Carbon dioxide, with small amounts of poisonous gases, became concentrated in many buildings partially buried by tephra, and several other people were affected when entering these buildings.

Efforts to mitigate the hazards presented by the accumulation of poisonous gas included the building of a large tephra wall to divert gases away from the town, and the digging of a trench to channel away the CO_{2}. These defences were only partially effective, as they relied on the assumption that the gases were produced at the vent, and flowed into the town from there. It is believed that as least some of the CO_{2} originated deep within the volcanic conduit and percolated through older volcanic rocks, rising directly into the town.

== Lava-cooling operations ==
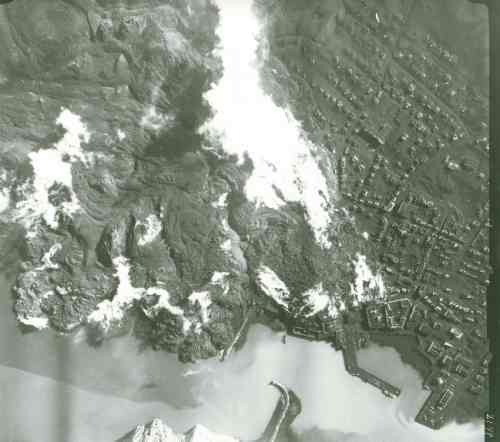
Steam rises copiously where seawater is being used to cool the flows

The possibility of lava flows cutting off the harbor was the most significant threat facing the town. One contingency plan devised, should the harbor be closed off, was to cut through a low sand spit on the north side of the island to provide a new channel into the harbor, but it was hoped that if the lava flow could be slowed, this would not be necessary. Lava flows had been sprayed with water in attempts to slow them in Hawaii and on Mount Etna, but these had been rather small-scale operations with limited success. However, Professor Þorbjörn Sigurgeirsson carried out an experiment that proved that further advances of the lava could be impeded by prematurely solidifying the advancing lava-flow front.

The first attempt to slow the lava flow by spraying the leading edge with sea water began on 6 February, and although the volume of water being pumped on was rather small at 100 litres per second (26 US (liquid) gallons per second), the flow was noticeably affected. The lava changed as water poured on it. Before cooling, the flow of the lava was blocky, covered with volcanic bombs and was a reddish oxidised colour. After cooling, the surface became more jagged and was much more difficult to walk on, and the flow surface turned from black to grey. (Richard & James, 1983) Water cooling of the lava was slow but efficient, with almost all the water converted to steam. Once the viability of lava cooling had been proven, efforts to halt the flows were increased.

The pumping capacity was increased in early March, when a large chunk of the crater wall broke away from the summit of Eldfell and began to be carried along the top of the lava flow towards the harbor. The chunk, dubbed Flakkarinn (The Wanderer), would have seriously threatened the viability of the harbor if it had reached it, and the dredging boat Sandey was brought in on 1 March to prevent its advance. Professor Þorbjörn Sigurgeirsson provided advice to the pumping crews on where to direct their efforts to most efficiently slow the flows. Eventually the Wanderer broke up into two pieces which both stopped approximately 100 metres (330 ft) from the harbor mouth.

The ensuing lava-cooling operations were the most ambitious that had ever been undertaken. Sandey was able to spray up to 400 litres per second (105 US gallons per second) onto the advancing flow, and a network of pipes was laid on top of the lava to distribute the seawater over as wide an area as possible. Wooden supports for the pipes caught fire where the lava was hottest, and even aluminium supports melted, but the pipes themselves were prevented from melting by the cold seawater flowing through them. Up to 12,000 square metres (3 acres) of lava flow could be cooled at one time, with internal barriers then being created within the flow, which thickened and piled up upon itself.

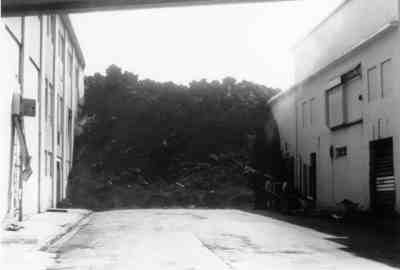
Water was pumped onto this lava flow to halt its advance down the street.

The work involved in laying pipes over an active lava flow was highly dangerous, with low visibility due to the extensive emission of steam. Rough tracks were made onto the flow by bulldozing tephra, but these tracks quickly became very uneven and moved several metres a day. The pipelayers used bulldozers and walkie-talkies to advance through the steam to lay more pipes. The workers dubbed themselves 'The Suicide Squad', and managed to lay pipes up to 130 metres (430 ft) inward from the flow front, directly over the advance. Although several men sustained minor burns, no serious injuries were received.

By the end of March, a fifth of the town had been covered by lava flows, and increased pumping capacity was required. Thirty-two pumps, each with a capacity of up to 1000 litres per second (265 US gallons per second), were brought in from the United States. After these pumps began to cool the flow advancing towards the town, its movement slowed dramatically and soon stopped. Failure of pump shafts became a problem after a few weeks, probably because they were designed for pumping oil rather than water, and new and improved shafts had to be manufactured in Reykjavík and brought in.

One notable feature of the lava cooling operation was the deposit of large amounts of salt where seawater was sprayed onto the lava. Large expanses of flow became encrusted with extensive white deposits, and it was estimated that up to 220,000 tonnes (240,000 short tons) of salt was deposited in total.

Sigurgeirsson called these protective measures "undoubtedly the most extensive that have ever been used in a volcanic eruption" and said that "had it not been for the cooling, the lava tongue [into the harbor] could be expected to…extend further along its direction of movement…for a whole month longer than it actually did. It failed by only about 100 meters to block the entrance to the harbor".

The cooling operation ended on 10 July 1973, and approximately 7.3 million cubic metres of seawater were pumped. This eruption was a special case where the method used to control the lava was suited to local conditions. Firstly, the initial eruption was only 1,000 m (1,100 yd) from the centre of town and harbor. Next, the flow of lava was slow and allowing time to plan and carry out control. Thirdly, sea water was available in its nearby harbor; and lastly, it was easy to move pipes and pump equipment as the transport system by sea and road was good. (Richard & James, 1983) The entire operation cost a total of US$1,447,742 at the time.

The eruption made headlines around the world when it began, and was covered constantly by Icelandic news crews throughout. In Europe, the eruption was one of the biggest news items while it continued, competing for front-page space with breakthroughs then being made in the Vietnam War peace talks in Paris. The efforts of the islanders to halt the lava flows received particular attention, with coverage in publications such as National Geographic. The attention focused on the island as a result of the eruption led to a later upsurge in tourism once the eruption was over.

== Final stages ==
Development of the coastline of Heimaey during the eruption of Eldfell in 1973

The volume of lava being emitted during the eruption fell steadily after the first few days. From its initial rate of 100 cubic metres per second (3,500 cu ft/s), the emission rate fell to about 60 m^{3}/s (2,100 cu ft/s) by 8 February, and just 10 m^{3}/s (350 cu ft/s) by the middle of March. The decline was slower after that, but by the middle of April the flow rate had fallen to about 5 m^{3}/s (180 cu ft/s).

Short-lived submarine activity was discovered by a fishing vessel on 26 May, about four kilometres (two nautical miles) northeast of Heimaey and 1 km (1/2 nmi) off the coast of the mainland. The eruption finally came to an end in early July, when flowing lava was no longer visible, although subsurface flows may have continued for a few days longer. Shortly before the end of the eruption, a tiltmeter 1,150 m (3,770 ft) from the crater which had been measuring ground deformation throughout the eruption detected subsidence towards the crater, implying that the shallow magma chamber which had fed the eruption was emptying out.

In total, the volume of lava and tephra emitted during the five-month eruption was estimated to be about 0.25 km^{3} (330,000,000 cu yd). About 2.5 km^{2} (1 sq mi) of new land was added to the island, increasing its pre-eruption area by some 20%. In the end the harbor entrance was narrowed considerably but not closed off, and the new lava flow acted as a breakwater, improving the shelter afforded by the harbor. Flakkarinn rafted several hundred metres towards the harbor along the top of the lava flow, but came to a halt well away from the water's edge.

== Heimaey since the eruption ==
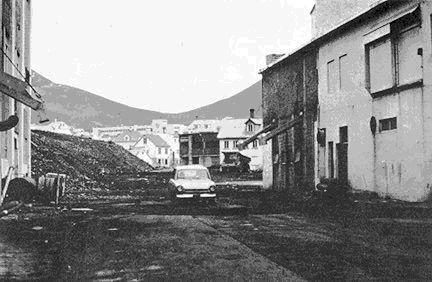
The street shown above, cleared of lava after the eruption

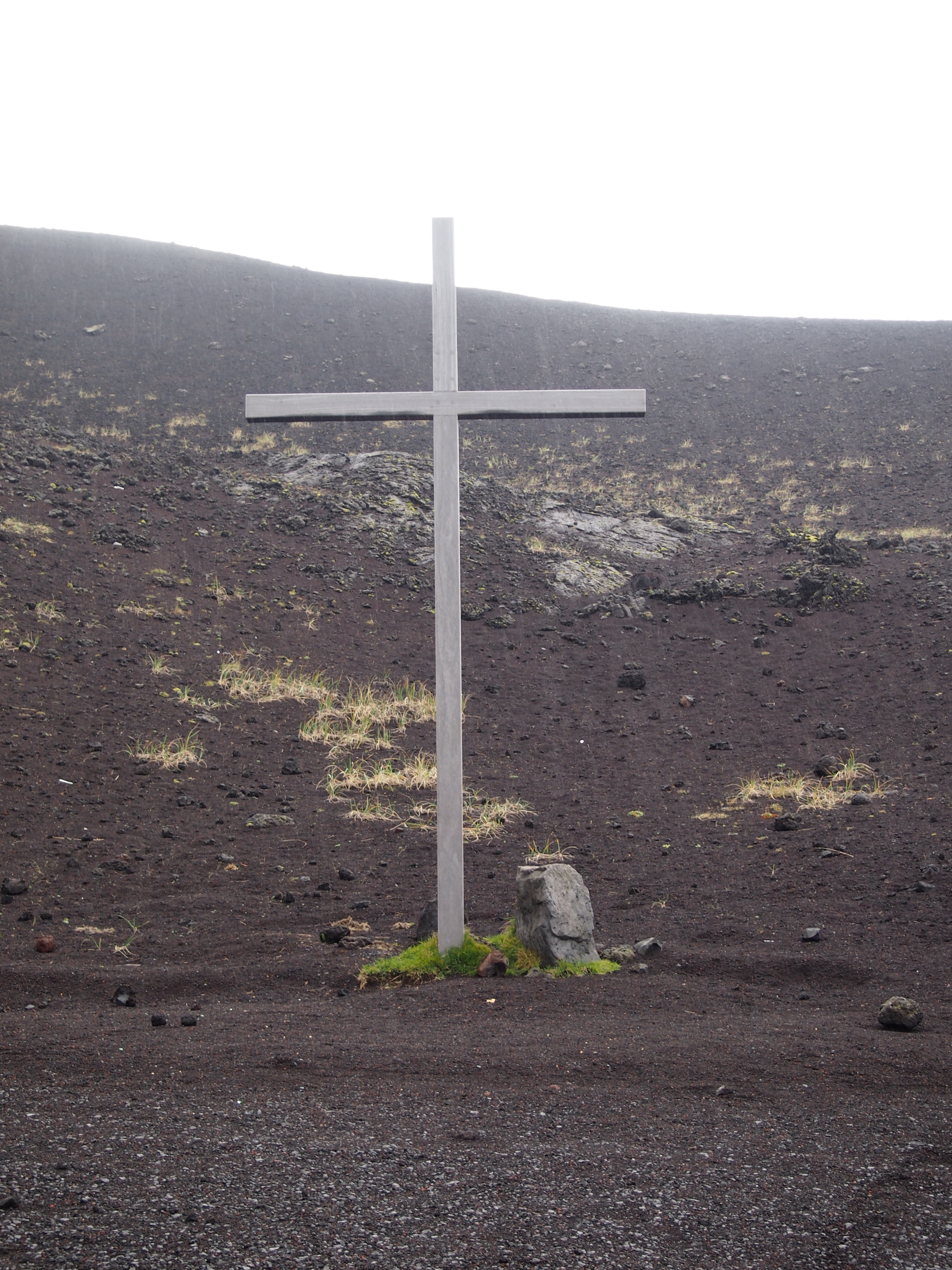
A cross was placed at the base of Eldfell after the eruption in 1973.

By the end of 1975, the population of the Westman Islands had returned to roughly 85% of its pre-eruption level. 42% among those with destroyed houses did not return before the end of 1975, while the rate was only 27% among those whose houses were not destroyed. By 1974, fishing companies in the Westman Islands were back to normal production levels. Counter-intuitively, the new lava field actually improved the harbor in the Westman Islands. Also counter-intuitive, the forced displacement had a large positive causal effect on both the earnings and education for those who were younger than 25 years old at the time of the eruption.

The insides of lava flows can remain at temperatures of several hundred degrees for many years due to the very low thermal conductivity of rock. Following the end of the eruption, scientists began to assess the feasibility of extracting geothermal heat from the gradually cooling flows. Experimental heating systems were soon devised, and by 1974 the first house was connected. The scheme was extended to several more houses and the hospital, and in 1979 construction began of four larger plants to extract heat from the flows. Each plant extracted energy from a square 100 metres (330 ft) on each side, by percolating water down into the hot parts and collecting the resulting steam. Up to 40 megawatts (MW) of power could be generated by the plants, which also then supplied hot water to nearly every house on the island.

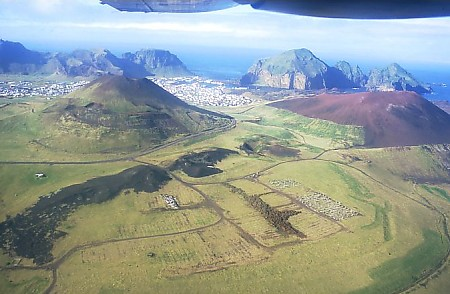
Helgafell (left) and Eldfell (right) in 2006. The fissure from the 1973 eruption is visible running from the lower left to the center of the image.

The tephra produced by the eruption was used to extend the runways at the island's small airport, and also as landfill on which 200 new homes were built. By mid-1974, about half the pre-eruption population had returned to the island, and by March 1975, about 80% had returned. The recovery and reconstruction of Heimaey was paid for by all Icelanders via a hypothecated sales tax, as well as through international aid totalling US$ 2.1 million primarily from Denmark but with substantial contributions from the United States and several international organisations. With the harbor improved by the new lava breakwater, the fishing industry regained its former vigour and the island today remains the most important fishing centre in the nation; over a third of Iceland's total fish catch is from this harbor.

By the end of the eruption, Eldfell stood about 220 metres (720 ft) above sea level. Since then, its height has dropped by 18 to 20 metres (60 to 65 feet), due to slumping and compacting of the unconsolidated gravelly tephra as well as wind erosion. The islanders have planted grass around the lower slopes of the otherwise bare hill, to stabilise it against further erosion, and eventually it is expected that most of the volcano will be covered by grass, as neighbouring Helgafell is.

== See also ==
- Geography of Iceland
- List of lakes of Iceland
- Volcanism of Iceland
  - List of volcanic eruptions in Iceland
  - List of volcanoes in Iceland
