= Turkish Abductions =

Barbary slave raids against Iceland

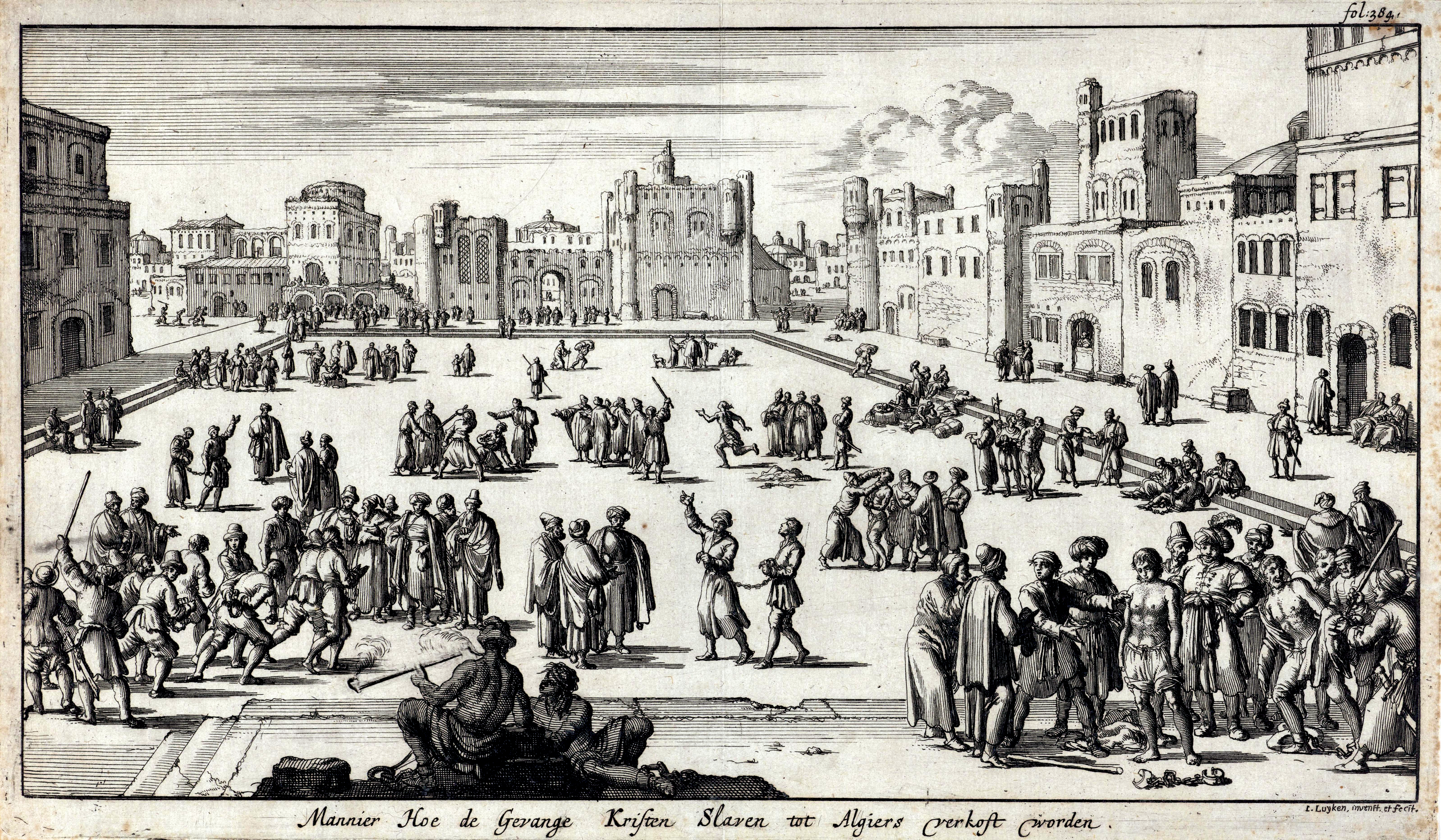
Europeans being sold at the slave market in Algiers, Ottoman Algeria, 1684

The Turkish Abductions (Icelandic: Tyrkjaránið [ˈtʰɪr̥caˌrauːnɪθ]) were a series of slave raids by pirates from Algiers and Salé that took place in Iceland in the summer of 1627.

The adjectival label "Turkish" (Icelandic: Tyrkja) does not refer to ethnic Turks, the country of Turkey or Turkic peoples in general; at the time it was a general term for all Muslims of the Mediterranean since the majority were from or subjects of the Ottoman Empire.

The pirates came from the cities of Algiers and Salé. They raided Grindavík, the East Fjords, and Vestmannaeyjar. About 51 people were killed and close to 400 captured and sold into slavery. Ransoms were eventually paid, 9 to 18 years later, for the release of 50 individuals.

== Raids ==
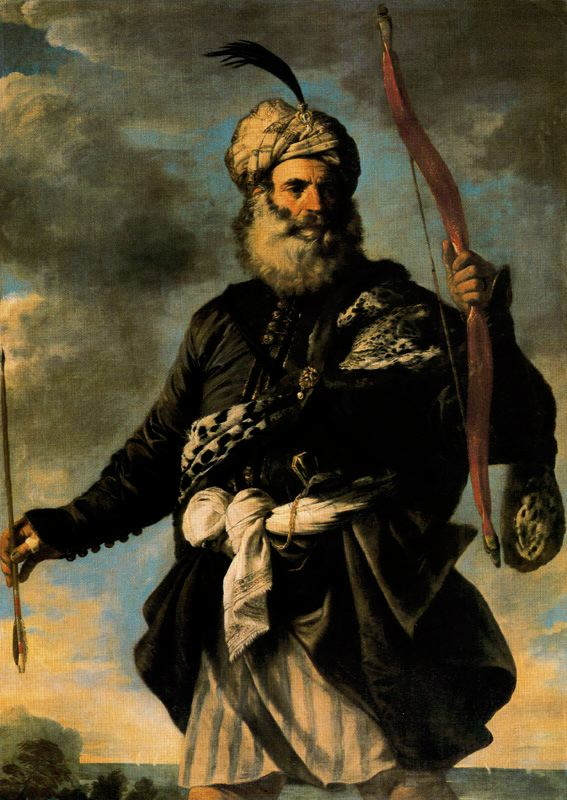
Barbary pirate depicted by Pier Francesco Mola (1612–1666)

The 1627 raid was not the first one. In 1607, both Iceland and the Faroe Islands were subjected to a slave raid by the Barbary pirates, who abducted hundreds of people for the slave markets of North Africa.

In 1627, the Barbary pirates came to Iceland in two groups: the first group was from Salé and the second one, which came a month later, was from Algiers. The commander of the group from Salé was a Dutchman known as Murat Reis, who had himself turned to piracy after being taken captive by pirates.

=== Grindavík ===
The group from Salé raided the fishing village of Grindavík on 20 June 1627. They captured between 12 and 15 Icelanders and a similar number of Danish and Dutch sailors. Two people from Grindavík died. They captured two ships and looted a third one.

The ships then sailed to Bessastaðir (home of the Danish-Norwegian governor of Iceland) to raid but were unable to make a landing. It is said they were thwarted by cannon fire from the local fortifications (Bessastaðaskans) and a quickly mustered group of lancers from the Southern Peninsula.

They then sailed home and sold their captives at the slave market of Salé.

=== East Fjords ===
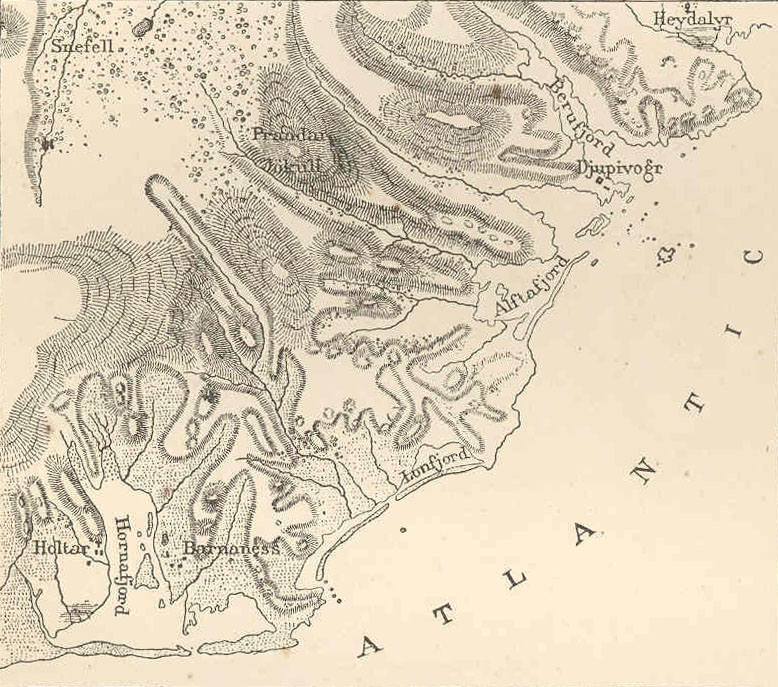
Fjords of the south-east of Iceland

The second group of raiders, the ones from Algiers, looted in the East Fjords from 5 to 13 July 1627. They captured a Danish merchant ship and sank it.

A total of 110 Icelanders were taken, mostly from Berufjörður and Breiðdalur, along with the crew of the captured Danish merchant ship. They additionally took livestock, silver and other goods.

North of Fáskrúðsfjörður, they hit strong winds and decided to turn around and sail along the south coast of Iceland. Another pirate ship joined them, and they also captured an English fishing vessel.

=== Vestmannaeyjar ===
As there were no harbors or landing sites along the south coast, the three ships eventually came on 16 July to Vestmannaeyjar, a group of islands off the coast. They raided the village and Heimaey for three days, capturing 234 people and killing 34, including one of the ministers of the island. Those offering resistance were killed, as were some of the old and infirm people. The market houses and the church were burned down. On 19 July, the ships left Vestmannaeyjar and sailed back to Algiers.

== Life in the Barbary ==
Upon reaching Algiers, the captives were placed in a prison, where "crowds of people came to see us, for to them we were a rare type of people. Many of the heathen women there, both black and white, had pity on us, shaking their heads and shedding tears. Some of them gave the children bread; some gave small coins." Then, the commander of the city state selected several individuals for himself; the rest were sold in the slave market.

Many died of illnesses after reaching Africa. Close to 100 individuals converted to Islam, mostly younger people. Eight years later there were 70 documented Icelanders who were still Christian.

A few letters written by captives reached Iceland. Guttormur Hallsson, a captive from Eastern Region, said in a letter written in Barbary in 1631: "There is a great difference here between masters. Some captive slaves get good, gentle, or in-between masters, but some unfortunates find themselves with savage, cruel, hardhearted tyrants, who never stop treating them badly, and who force them to labour and toil with scanty clothing and little food, bound in iron fetters, from morning till night."

== Return ==
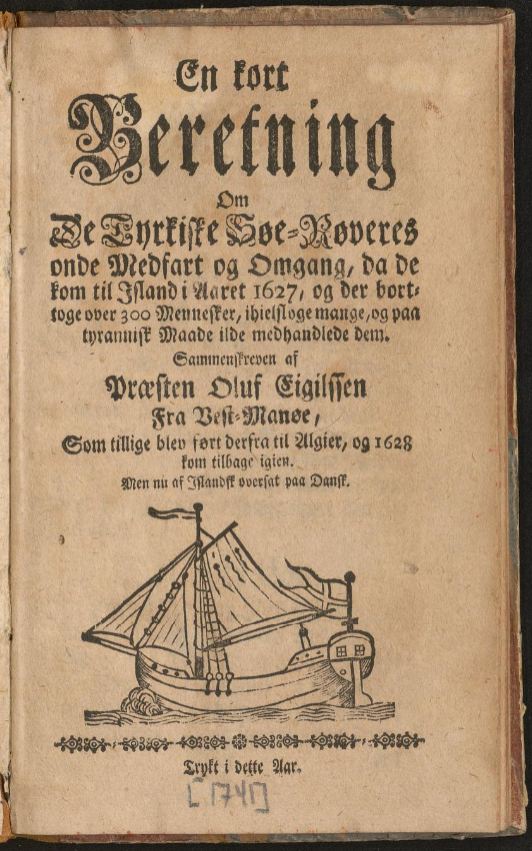
Ólafur Egilsson's book about his experience. The page reads in danish: A kept tale of the [unreadable] pirates evil travel and tale, when they came to Iceland in the year of 1627, and there abducted over 300 people, killed many and in a tyranical way mistreated them. Composed by the priest Oluf Eigilssen from east Manøe, who in addition was taken from there to Algeria, and in 1628 came back again.Which is now by [unreadable] translated to danish. Published in this year [1741]

Ólafur Egilsson, a minister from Vestmannaeyjar, was set free in Algiers so that he could go and raise money to pay the ransom. He eventually made it to Copenhagen. The fundraising was slow.

On two occasions, those carrying the ransom to Algiers betrayed the captives, and used the money to purchase goods that they traded back in Europe. A letter describes the pain:

... to know that those who have been here twice to Algiers with our ransom money have used it instead for trade, to make profit for themselves, and have stolen our liberty, for they never admitted that they could free anyone, or even that they were here to do so. Instead, they told us to petition our gracious master the King, in the name of God, for our freedom, and then they filled simple minded, poor fellows with fair words and went on their way, one with hides, another with chests of sugar, leaving behind them only the smoke of their lying words

The first major ransom was paid nine years after the abductions when 34 Icelanders were brought from Algiers. Six died on the way back, and one was left behind in Glückstadt. A few others had made it back using other methods. In 1645, a ransom was paid for an additional eight people, who made it back to Copenhagen. In total, 50 individuals obtained their freedom, but not all returned to Iceland.

The most notable captive was Guðríður Símonardóttir. She returned to Iceland and later married Hallgrímur Pétursson, one of Iceland's most famous poets.

== Legacy ==
In Iceland, the Turkish Abductions are viewed as a major event and one that is still often discussed, but outside of Iceland the event is practically unknown. Multiple detailed works were written about the event at the time; a major one was Ólafur Egilsson's narrative (Reisubók Ólafs Egilssonar; Ólafur Egilsson's travelogue). It was translated and published in English in 2008. The abductions were viewed at the time as a punishment from God for Iceland's sinful lifestyle. They are the only armed expedition against Iceland in modern times that has resulted in any casualties.

== See also ==
- Barbary slave trade
- Sack of Baltimore
- Sklavenkasse
- Slave raid of Suðuroy
- Slavery in the Ottoman Empire

== Primary sources ==
- Tyrkjaránið á Íslandi, 1627, Sögurit, 4 (Reykjavík: Sögufélag, 1906–1909)
- The Travels of Reverend Ólafur Egilsson (Reisubók Séra Ólafs Egilssonar): The story of the Barbary corsair raid on Iceland in 1627, trans. by Karl Smári Hreinsson and Adam Nichols (The Catholic University of America Press, 2016), ISBN 978-0813228693
