= Helgafell (Vestmannaeyjabær) =

Volcanic cone on Heimaey Island, Iceland

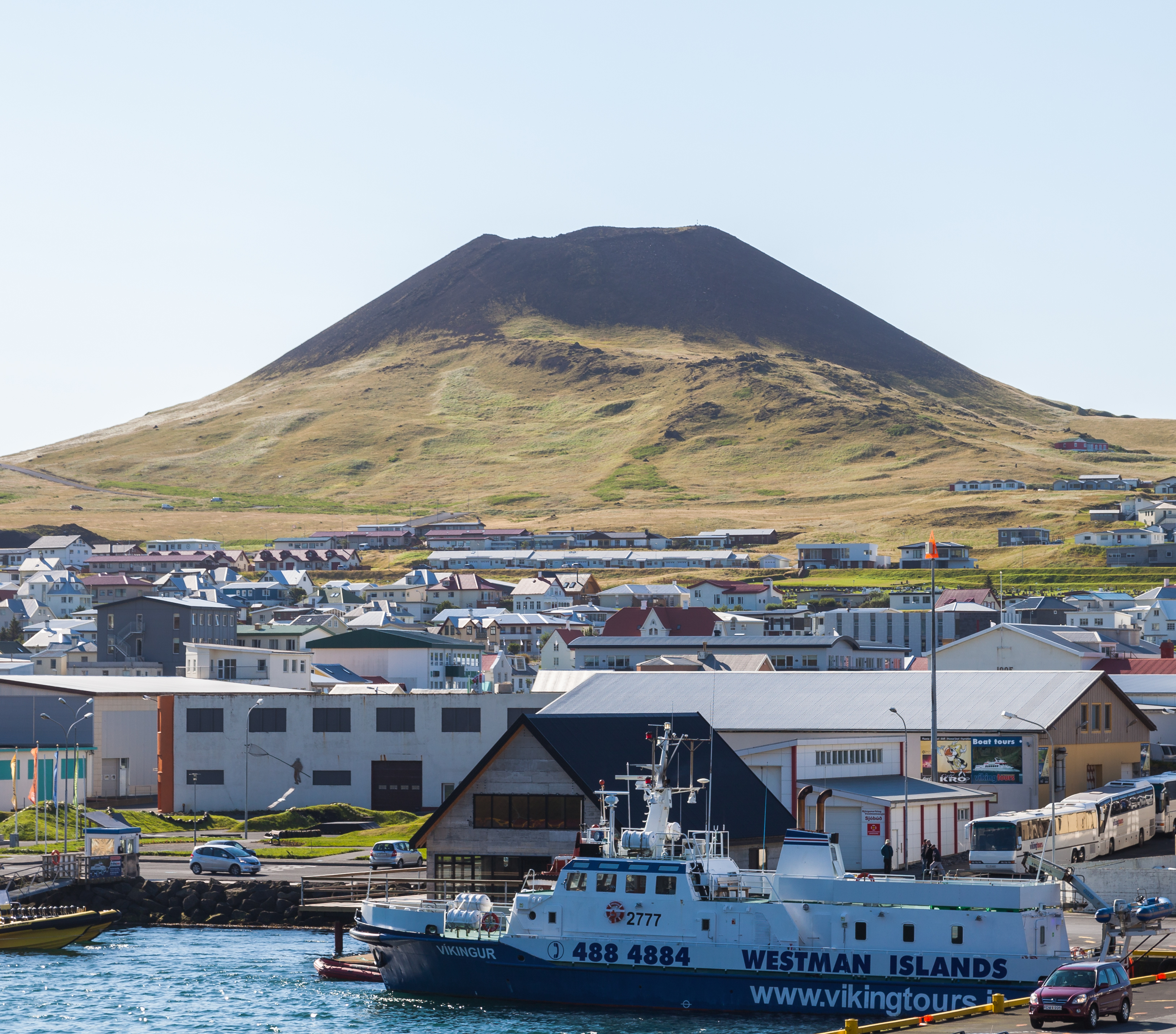
- The cone of the Helgafell volcano seen from Heimaey harbor

Highest point
- Elevation: 227 m (745 ft)
- Coordinates: 63°25′45″N 20°15′36″W

Geography
- Location within Iceland
- Location: Heimaey, Iceland

Geology
- Rock age: 5,000 years
- Last eruption: 3950 BCE ± 300 years

Helgafell (Icelandic pronunciation: [ˈhɛlkaˌfɛtl̥], "Helgi's mountain") is an inactive 227 m (745 ft) volcanic cone located on the island of Heimaey in the Vestmannaeyjar archipelago in Iceland.

The Stórhöfði peninsula immediately to the south of Helgafell in what is now southern Heimaey formed about 6000 years ago. Helgafell formed a thousand years later in a monogenetic volcanic eruption, which created much of the present island over a period of between 11 and 12 months, at 3950 BCE ± 300 years. This erupted 0.65 km^{3} (0.16 cu mi) of lava and scoria with a DRE of 0.59 km^{3} (0.14 cu mi). Immediately north of Helgafell is the active volcano Eldfell, which had a no warning disruptive monogenetic fissure eruption commencing January 23, 1973.

== See also ==
- Volcanism of Iceland
  - List of volcanic eruptions in Iceland
  - List of volcanoes in Iceland
