= Arthur Charles Gook =

Arthur Charles Gook (11 June 1883, London, England—18 June 1959) – a homeopathic physician, Protestant missionary, writer and radio voice, he is primarily known today for having translated Reverend Hallgrímur Pétursson's Passion Hymns into English.

The third of five sons, Arthur Gook's father was a teacher. Gook distinguished himself as a student and won a university scholarship. His father, having taken up a new profession as an estate agent, would not allow him to attend a university. Instead, Gook was made to work in the family business. Later, he became personal secretary to a London publisher, and it was there he trained for the literary and publishing work he undertook later in life.

Arther Gook was converted in a Bible class, and the Bible became his favourite book. He determined to reform his life and joined with the Open Brethren, which was a branch of the Plymouth Brethren religious sect.

== Homeopathy ==
While working at the London Homeopathic Hospital, Gook received formal training as a homeopath. His wife, Florence Ethel Gook, received her training at the Missionary School of Homeopathy in London. Frederic H. Jones, a Scot, had started a mission in Iceland in 1897. Upon his death in 1905, Arthur and Florence Gook went to Iceland to carry on his work. They settled in Akureyri, which was the headquarters of his work for the next fifty years. It appears the Gooks supported their missionary work by being the first professionally trained homeopaths in Iceland. He is still commemorated as the founder of homeopathy in Iceland.

== Radio broadcasting ==
Gook built a private radio station and started gospel broadcasts, a unique achievement in his time. Saemundur later became an influential radio voice in the religious program of the Icelandic national radio. The start of the UK Gospel Recordings centre occurred when Arthur Gook heard of the work of Gospel Recordings. He was forward looking and probably the first Christian to get the vision for using radio to spread the Gospel. He built the first ever Christian radio station, but was unable to continue its operation, due to the government refusing to issue a licence to broadcast.

He immediately saw the way he could use the records in Iceland and contacted Gospel Recordings in the United States and work for the commencement of a British branch. Faced with the technical problems of making the Icelandic recordings, he turned to Eric Hogg, an electronic engineer who, as a young man of 20, had built the radio station for him.

Eric Hogg, who was involved in the Missionary Technical Fellowship (who provided technical support to serving missionaries) also caught the vision of Gospel Recordings. He invited Joy Ridderhof to England in 1955 and arranged meetings and a press conference in London. It was during this time that the UK headquarters was established.

Rev George Scott, then Home Director of China Inland Mission was the first Chairman. Scott, along with Eric Hogg and Gilbert Vinden, became the first members of the UK Council of Gospel Recordings, at one time the publishers of the largest amount of 45 rpm records.

== Author ==
Gook wrote a number of books, both in English and in Icelandic. His book Can a Young Man Trust His Bible? (Icelandic: «Er biblían ábyggileg?» (1913); Danish: Kan man stole på sin Bibel? (1911)) was translated into many languages, and during a world tour in 1950–1951, he found that his work had preceded him.

His other books include:

- Can a Young Man Find the Path?, London: Pickering & Inglis, 1958.
- Can a Young Man Overcome?, London: Pickering & Inglis, [n.d].
- Can a Young Man Trust His God?, London: Pickering & Inglis, [n.d.].
- Can a Young Man Trust His Saviour??, London: Pickering & Inglis, [n.d.].
- Fighting with Beasts: a Chat with Young Christians, London: Pickering & Inglis, [n.d.].
- Which Has Won: Modernism Or the Bible?, London: Pickering & Inglis, 1937.

Among his literary achievements was the translation of Arthur T. Pierson's biography of George Müller (unabridged) into Icelandic.

Gook started the Christian periodical Nórdurljósid, translated The Northern Light. The Lowe Continental Brethren donated funds in its early days with the finance of this magazine. Gook was assisted by the Icelandic schoolteacher, Saemundur Johannesson, who continued the periodical for more than 25 years. Saemundur wrote or translated from English most of its contents. Nórdurljósið was widely distributed, but when Saemundur died, it ceased circulation.

== Translator ==
Gook was a man of poetic taste and greatly admired the Hymns of the Passion by Rev Hallgrímur Pétursson. Although an earlier English translation of the hymns had been made in 1913, Gook was not satisfied. When he returned to England in 1955, due to poor health, he began a new translation of Pétursson's Passion Hymns into English. As far as possible, he kept to the metrical form of the original. His colleague Saemundur G. Jóhannesson comments in a preface to the published translation, "His literary taste, poetic mind, and musical ear, his knowledge of the Bible, and spiritual affinity with the Rev. Pétursson, made him eminently fitted for his difficult task."

Gook died in 1959, with the translation still incomplete. A few alterations were made after his death. Gook's translation of Rev Pétursson's Hymns of the Passion was published in 1966 by Hallgrímskirkja, under the imprimatur of the Bishop of Iceland. While Gook's English translation of the hymns is the most widely available edition, his Plymouth Brethren theology replaced the Lutheran theology found in Pétursson's original text, and is therefore not considered the authoritative and preferred translation.
