= Hallgrímskirkja (Hvalfjörður) =

Church in Hvalförður, Iceland

Coordinates: 64.4055°N 21.6255°W

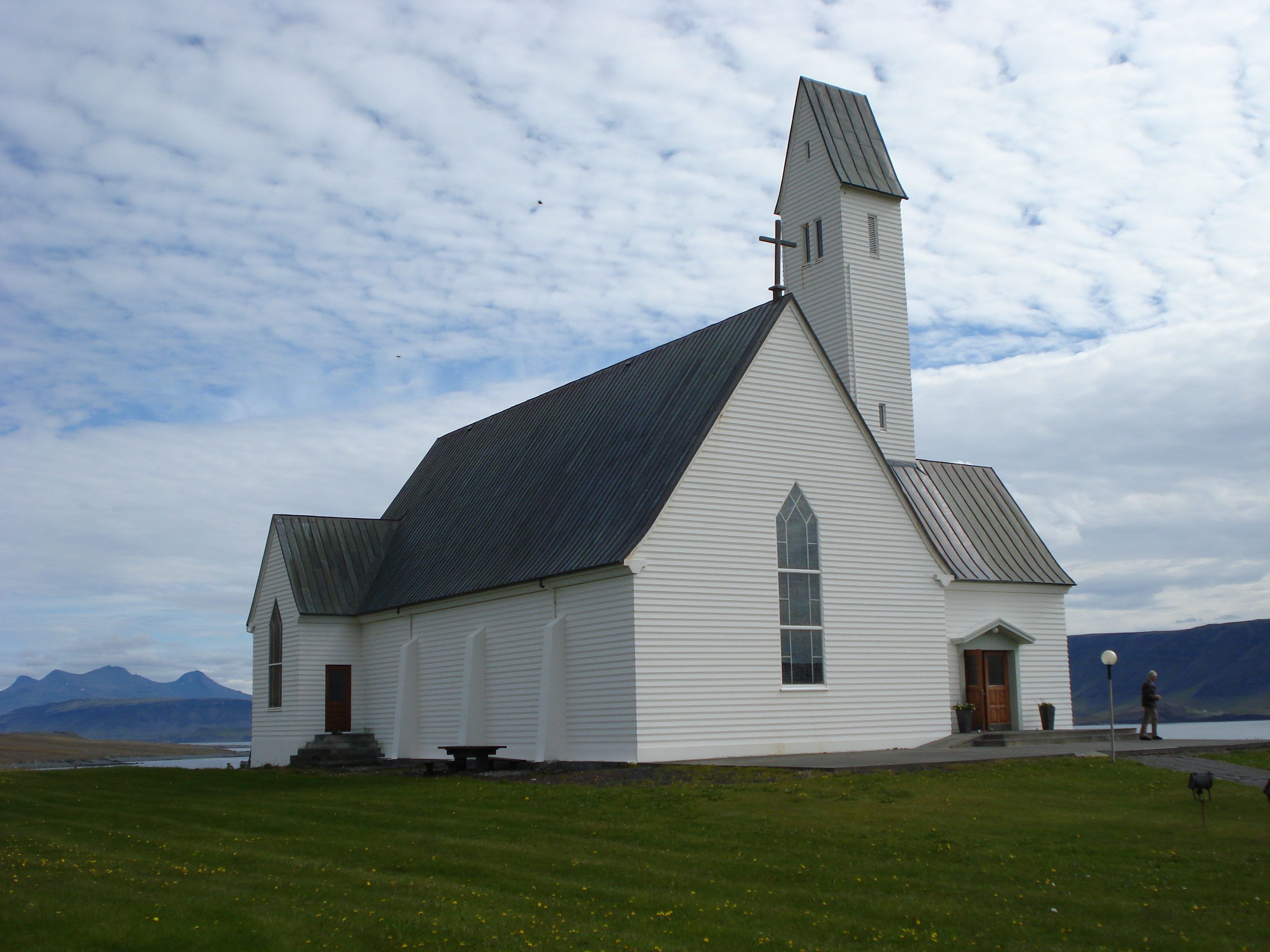
Hallgrímskirkja in 2007

Hallgrímskirkja (Icelandic pronunciation: [ˈhatl̥ˌkrimsˌcʰɪr̥ca], church of Hallgrímur), also known as Hallgrímskirkja í Saurbæ [i ˈsœyːrˌpaiː] or Saurbæjarkirkja [ˈsœyːrˌpaiːjarˌcʰɪr̥ca], is a church in Hvalfjarðarsveit, Iceland.

== History ==
The church was consecrated on 28 July 1957 and is dedicated to Hallgrímur Pétursson (1614–1674), who was the pastor of the local parish between 1651 and 1669.

Icelandic State Architect Guðjón Samúelsson (1887–1950) was the first to draw a model of the church and it was according to his design that the foundations were cast. However, work was postponed because of World War II. In 1953, architects Sigurður Guðmundsson (1885-1958) and Eiríkur Einarsson (1907-1969) came together to design the current concrete church, with its brick interiors, copper roof and 20-metre-high (66 ft) tower. Icelandic sculptor Gerður Helgadóttir (1928- 1975) designed the stained glass artwork of the church. The frescoes around the altar are the work of Finnish artist Lennart Segerstråle (1892–1975). The crucifix on the altar itself dates back to the 16th century.
