= Ólafur Egilsson =

Icelandic Lutheran minister and victim of the Turkish abductions of 1627

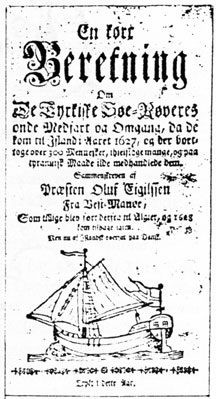
Title page of the Danish edition of Ólafur's memoir

Ólafur Egilsson (1564 – 1 March 1639) was an Icelandic Lutheran minister. In 1627, he was abducted, along with his wife and two sons, by Barbary Pirates under the Ottoman Empire during their raid on Vestmannaeyjar. The raid is known in Icelandic history as Tyrkjaránið (The Turkish abductions). He returned to Vestmannaeyjar in 1628 but his wife Ásta Þorsteinsdóttir did not return until 1637 and his sons never returned. He later wrote a memoir of his abduction and return, which was published both in Iceland and in Denmark.

Ólafur Egilsson and his wife Ásta Þorsteinsdóttir are major characters in the 2018 historical novel The Sealwoman's Gift by Sally Magnusson.

== Published work ==
- Egilsson, Ólafur (1741). En kort Beretning Om De Tyrkiske Søe-Røveres onde Medfart og Omgang, da de kom til Island i Aaret 1627, og der borttoge over 300 Mennesker, ihjelsloge mange, og paa tyrannisk Maade ilde medhandlede dem : sammenskreven af Præsten Oluf Eigilssen fra Vest-Manøe, som tillige blev ført derfra til Algier, og 1628 kom tilbage igien. Danish text. A short account of the Turkish pirates' wicked conduct and dealings when they came to Iceland in the year 1627, and there abducted more than 300 people, struck many dead, and in a tyrannical way mistreated them badly: written by the minister Oluf Eigilssen from Westman island, who was also taken from there to Algiers, and 1628 came back again.
- Egilsson, Ólafur (1852). Lítil saga umm herhlaup Tyrkjans á Íslandi árið 1627. Edited by Hallvarður Hængsson and Hrærekur Hrólfsson. Reykjavík. Icelandic text. A short story about the Turkish invasion of Iceland in 1627
- Egilsson, Ólafur (2016). The Travels of Reverend Ólafur Egilsson: The Story of the Barbary Corsair Raid on Iceland in 1627. Translated from the original Icelandic text and edited by Karl Smári Hreinsson and Adam Nichols. Washington, D.C.: Catholic University of America Press. ISBN 978-0-8132-2869-3.

== See also ==
- Guðríður Símonardóttir
- Hark Olufs
