= Aldarháttur =

17th-century Icelandic poem

Aldarháttur ('signs of the times') is a seventeenth-century Icelandic poem by the famous poet and churchman Hallgrímur Pétursson. It is one of the first poetic examples of Icelanders regarding their medieval past as a golden age.

== Origin ==
The poem was almost certainly composed in 1663, inspired by the Icelanders officially accepting the King of Denmark as their absolute monarch in 1662.

== Form ==
The poem is hexametrical, written in leonine metre. It is the first example of the adaptation of this metre to Icelandic poetry, showing the influence of early modern humanism in Iceland. However, it also draws on the language of medieval Icelandic skaldic verse. Thus the poem combines Classical and indigenous traditions in a striking way.

== Content ==
The poem is a polemic which compares the Iceland of Hallgrímur's own time with the Icelandic commonwealth (c. 930-1262, before Iceland came under foreign rule).

In those days people were valiant, appreciated their freedom more than gold, and did not subit to oppression by threat. Here, Iceland's medieval past is for the first time glamorized in Icelandic poetry. The poet criticizes his own era for laziness, lack of solidarity, cowardice, and an unjust legal system.

== Influence ==
The poem is the stated model for Bjarki Karlsson's 2013 heimsósómakvæði (lament on the state of the world), 'Þúsaldarháttur'.

== Editions ==
- Séra Hallgrímur Pétursson, Hallgrímsljóð: Sálmar og kvæði, ed. by Freysteinn Gunnarsson (Reykjavík: Leiftur, 1944), pp. 263–72
