= Guðríður Símonardóttir =

Icelandic woman abducted by Barbary pirates in 1627

Guðríður Símonardóttir (1598 – December 18, 1682) was an Icelandic woman who was one of 242 people abducted from the Westman Islands, Iceland in 1627 in a raid by Barbary pirates. These raids came to be known as the Turkish abductions. After being held as a slave and concubine for nearly a decade, she was one of a few captives ransomed by the Danish king. She returned to Iceland, marrying the young theology student Hallgrímur Pétursson, who became known for his poetry and hymns.

== Life ==
Guðríður was the wife of a fisherman (Eyjólfur Sölmundarson), living at Stakkagerði in the Westman Islands. Following her abduction in 1627 from the Westman Islands, she was sold by the pirates as a slave and concubine in Algeria. In 1631, while still enslaved, she sent a letter to her husband in Iceland, who had escaped from the pirates and still lived in the Westman Islands. Guðríður was among the few who were ransomed nearly a decade later by King Christian IV of Denmark, although she had also managed to save some money towards purchasing her freedom. Her young son, who was captured at the same time, remained in Algeria.

After being freed, Guðríður was sent to Denmark along with a group of other former slaves to be re-educated. They were taught by Hallgrímur Pétursson, then a theology student. They fell in love and she became pregnant by him. They returned to Iceland where she learned that her first husband, Eyjólfur, had died. Their son Eyjólfur was born in 1637, and she and Hallgrímur married in 1638. The couple had two other children, both of whom died in childhood: Guðmundur and Steinunn.

Although his studies abroad ended when Guðríður became pregnant, Hallgrímur was ordained as minister for Hvalsnes in 1644 and later was called as the pastor of a church at Saurbær, Iceland (1651–1669). He became well known for his poetry and especially what are known as Passion Hymns (Passíusálmar), recounting the life and death (The Passion) of Christ.

Very little is known of Guðríður after her return to Iceland, but in later reception she became known by the derogatory nickname of Tyrkja-Gudda, and various claims were made in later folktales, including that she was a hag who seduced Hallgrímur and kept Muslim idols in secret, which Hallgrímur burned on discovering them. Sigurður Nordal wrote an early defense of Guðríður Símonardóttir, pointing out the absurdity of claiming that a practitioner of Islam would own — much less worship — idols, and more recent depictions of Guðríður and her life have been overwhelmingly positive. Dagný Kristjánsdóttir argues that later legends about Tyrkja-Gudda have little to do with the actual historical person of Guðríður herself, instead warping her into a fantasy of the exotic and foreign world of Barbary as imagined in Iceland.

== Representation in media ==
The Icelandic playwright Jakob Jónsson wrote a drama about Tyrkja-Gudda in 1952.

Steinunn Jóhannesdóttir, who acted in a 1983-1984 production of Jakob Jónsson's play, later wrote a historical novel about Guðríður's experiences, called Reisubók Guðríðar Símonardóttur (Gudridur's Journey, 2001). The book was on the bestseller list in Iceland for months, and it has been reprinted every year since first being published. Rights have been sold to Germany and Norway.

Guðríður is a character in the 2018 historical novel The Sealwoman's Gift by Sally Magnusson.

== See also ==
- List of slaves
