= Veit Warbeck =

Veit Warbeck (1490–1534) was a German scientist and diplomat, born in Schwäbisch Gmünd. He is best known as the translator into German of the French Magelone, a narrative text itself derived from the One Thousand and One Nights material. In turn, Ludwig Tieck adapted Warbeck's translation for his Liebesgeschichte der schönen Magelone und des Grafen Peter von Provence.

Warbeck worked as a diplomat at the court of John Frederick I, Elector of Saxony, when he translated the Magelone in 1527; his work on that text was occasioned by John Frederick's marriage to Sibylle of Cleves. The book was printed by Heinrich Steyner in Augsburg in 1535, and was reprinted more than twenty times that same century, evidence of its popularity. The most recent adaptation of the same subject matter was by Peter Bichsel (Der Busant. Von Trinkern, Polizisten und der schoenen Magelone, Darmstadt und Neuwied 1985). He was befriended with George Spalatin and other important Protestant reformers, and his translation of the Magelone shows the influence of Protestantism in the suppression of Catholic elements. Warbeck was honored with an exposition in his hometown in 1985.
