= Passion Hymns =

Poetric texts written by Hallgrímur Pétursson

Hallgrímur Pétursson, author of the Passion Hymns

The Passíusálmar or Passion Hymns are a collection of 50 poetic texts written by the Icelandic minister and poet, Hallgrímur Pétursson. The texts explore the Passion narrative, as traditionally presented, from the point where Jesus enters the Garden of Gethsemane to his death and burial.

== History ==
Hallgrímur began composing the work in 1656, while serving as pastor of Saurbær in Hvalfjörður. It took him three years to complete, the final poem being written in May 1659; the first edition was published seven years later, in 1666. By the end of the century they had become so popular in Iceland that five editions had been published. Since that time, they have been reprinted more than 75 times, a unique achievement in Icelandic literature. The poems were translated into many other languages, including Latin, English, Chinese and Danish.

The first English edition was published in 1913. In the 1950s a new translation was made by Arthur Charles Gook. This new translation received the imprimatur of the Bishop of Iceland, Sigurbjörn Einarsson, and is published by Hallgrímskirkja. In addition, a selection of texts were translated by Anglican Bishop Charles Venn Pilcher and published in a pamphlet entitled "Thirty-One Meditations on Christ's Passion"; this translation, although incomplete, is regarded as more faithful to Hallgrímur's Lutheran theology.

The Passíusálmar quickly became an important part of Icelandic religious expression, being sung or read during Lent in every Icelandic home; today, they are broadcast on the radio during that time of year. They have been set to music by many composers of Icelandic church music, including Þorkell Sigurbjörnsson and Jón Hlöðver Áskelsson, but use outside Iceland is rare.

== Antisemitism ==
Since 1943, state broadcaster RÚV has annually broadcast the hymns during Lent, a tradition initiated at the urging of Sigurbjörn Einarsson. For each of the fifty days leading up to Easter, an Icelander reads one verse of the hymns. In 2012, Rabbi Abraham Cooper of the Simon Wiesenthal Center attempted and failed to stop this practice, arguing that their many negative references to Jews reinforced antisemitic hatred. However, RÚV director Páll Magnússon rejected the request, telling Cooper to "bear in mind that the hymns are written 350 years ago and they describe the poet's feelings about events that supposedly took place around 2000 years ago." Vilhjálmur Örn Vilhjálmsson has commented that the episode revealed that "no Icelandic researcher on Pétursson's poetry had ever considered whether the Passiusalmar were perhaps not a uniquely Icelandic phenomenon," but representative of European antisemitism prevalent at the time of their writing.

== Hymns ==
1. Christ goes to the Garden
2. Christ's Suffering in the Garden
3. “Sorrowful, even unto Death”
4. Christ's Appeals to His Disciples
5. The Jews arrive in the Garden
6. Judas' Kiss and Christ's Arrest
7. Peter's Defence and Malchus' Wounded Ear
8. Christ's Address to the Jews
9. The Flight of the Disciples
10. The First Enquiry before Caiaphas
11. Peter's Denial
12. Peter's Repentance
13. The False Witnesses and Caiaphas' Judgment
14. The Soldiers mock Christ
15. The Priests' Conference
16. The Remorse of Judas
17. The Potter's Field
18. The Jews' First Charge before Pilate
19. Christ's Confession before Pilate
20. The Jews' Second Charge before Pilate
21. Herod's Curiosity and the Gorgeous Robe
22. The Demand for Crucifixion
23. The Scourging of Christ
24. The Scarlet Robe and Crown of Thorns
25. Christ led from the Judgment Hall
26. Christ and Pilate
27. Pilate and the Jews
28. Pilate's unjust Judgment
29. Release of Barabbas
30. Christ bears His Cross
31. Christ's Address to the Women
32. The Green and the Dry Tree
33. The Crucifixion of Christ
34. The First Cry from the Cross
35. The Superscription on the Cross
36. Christ's Garments divided
37. The Second Cry from the Cross
38. The Mocking suffered on the Cross
39. The Thief's Repentance
40. The Third Cry from the Cross
41. The Fourth Cry from the Cross
42. The Fifth Cry from the Cross
43. The Sixth Cry from the Cross
44. The Seventh Cry from the Cross
45. The Death of Christ
46. The Signs that accompanied His Death
47. Christ's Friends, who stood far off
48. The Saviour's wounded Side
49. The Burial of Christ
50. The Guard on Watch
