= Hallgrímur Pétursson =

17th century Icelandic writer and minister

- Hallgrímur Pétursson
- Born: 1614; Gröf, Iceland
- Died: 27 October 1674 (aged 59–60); Ferstikla, Iceland
- Spouse: Guðríður Símonardóttir

Hallgrímur Pétursson (1614 – 27 October 1674) was an Icelandic poet and a minister at Hvalsneskirkja and Saurbær in Hvalfjörður. Being one of the most prominent Icelandic poets, the Hallgrímskirkja in Reykjavík and the Hallgrímskirkja in Saurbær are named in his honor. He was one of the most influential pastors during the Age of Orthodoxy (1580–1713). Because of his contributions to Lutheran hymnody, he is sometimes called the Icelandic Paul Gerhardt.

== Biography ==
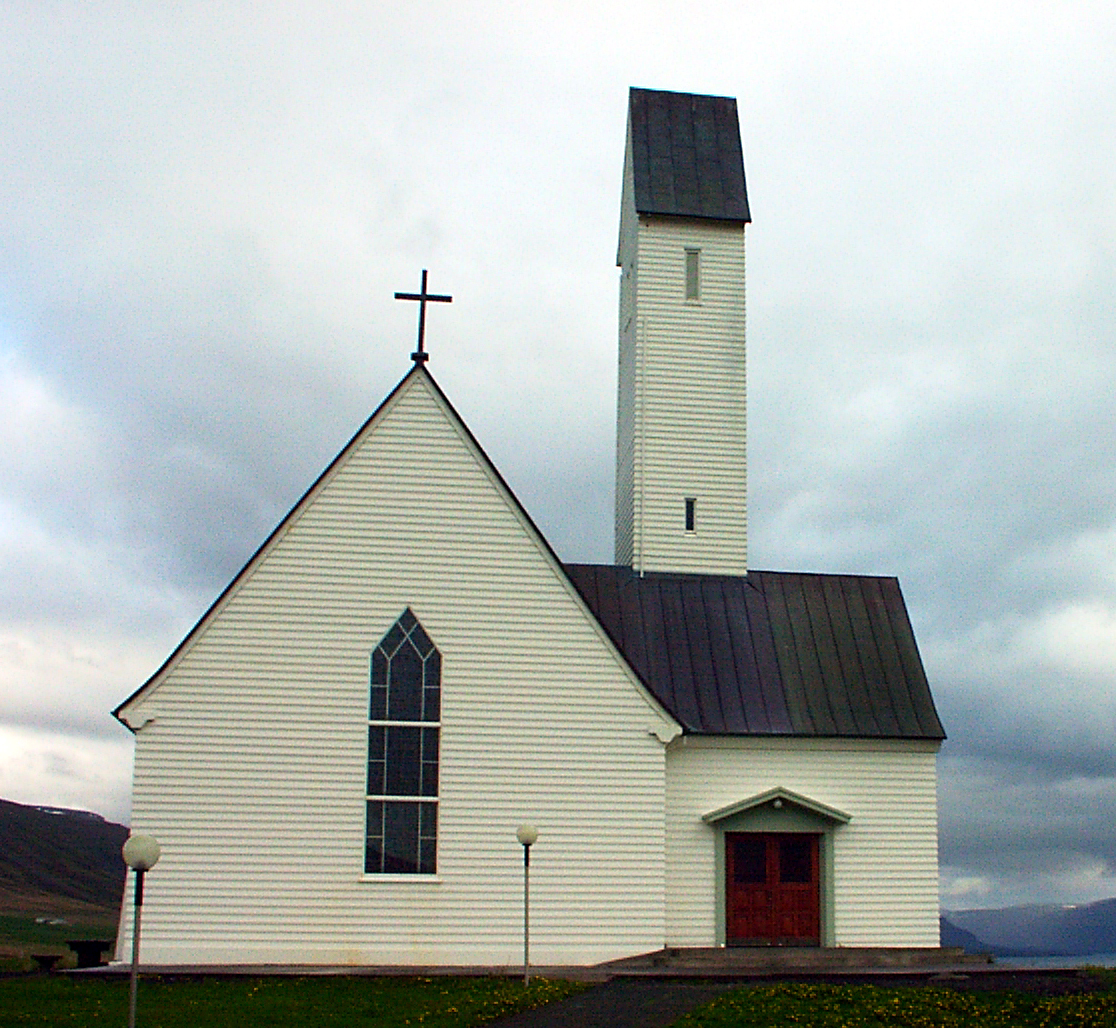
The Hallgrímskirkja in Saurbær.

Hallgrímur Pétursson was likely born at Gröf in Skagafjörður. He grew up at Hólar, where his father was the bell-ringer and his cousin Guðbrandur Þorláksson the resident bishop. As a young man, he left Hólar for unknown reasons and travelled to mainland Europe, possibly to learn the blacksmith trade. He ended in Copenhagen, where Brynjólfur Sveinsson sponsored him to attend the seminary at the Church of Our Lady. Brynjólfur had family connections to Hallgrímur, as his half-brother was married to Hallgrímur's aunt.

According to folk legend, Brynjólfur first encountered Hallgrímur by chance when travelling through Glückstadt in the Duchy of Schleswig (then under Danish rule). Hallgrímur's blacksmith employer mistreated the boy, and in passing Brynjólfur heard Hallgrímur curse his employer in Icelandic. Brynjólfur took pity on the young Icelander and saw to it that the boy was educated.

During his last year of study there, Hallgrímur was employed to re-educate a group of Icelanders who had been kidnapped by Barbary pirates in the Turkish Abductions in 1627 and ransomed ten years later. Among them was a woman, Guðríður Símonardóttir, sixteen years Hallgrímur's senior, with whom he fell in love. Guðríður was married to a man from the Westman Islands, who had not been captured in the raid. After Guðríður became pregnant by Hallgrímur, he left the seminary and returned with the group to Iceland. On their arrival it emerged that Guðríður's husband had died, leaving her a widow; she and Hallgrímur promptly married and he worked as a labourer for a number of years.

Seven years after Hallgrímur's return to Iceland, Brynjólfur Sveinsson, his former sponsor and then bishop at Skálholt, appointed Hallgrímur as minister at Hvalsnes. Some people were surprised that the ungraduated worker should be ordained, but Hallgrímur showed himself a skillful preacher. In 1651, he was reassigned to Saurbær in Hvalfjörður, a much sought-after position. He served there until his death in 1674 from leprosy.

== Works ==
Hallgrímur Pétursson's most notable work is Passion Hymns (Passíusálmar or, in full, "Historia pínunnar og dauðans Drottins vors Jesú Kristi, með hennar sérlegustu lærdóms-, áminningar- og huggunargreinum, ásamt bænum og þakkargjörðum, í sálmum og söngvísum með ýmsum tónum samsett og skrifuð anno 1659": "The history of the pain and death of our Lord, Jesus Christ, with its special learning, reminding, and consoling articles, with prayers and praises, in psalms and songs with misc. notes, compiled and written in the year 1659"), a collection of fifty hymns to be sung, one for each working day, during the seven weeks of Lent. Each hymn has a title denoting to which part of the Passion of Christ it refers and a reference to a melody to which it may be sung. Like much Christian literature of the time, the hymns are sometimes antisemitic.

Other famous works include Aldarháttur, Rímur af Lykla-Pétri og Magellónu, Króka-Refs rímur, and a collection of cautionary children's rhymes.

A monograph on Hallgrímur Pétursson's life and works, by the Icelandic scholar Margrét Eggertsdóttir, was published in Icelandic in 2005. An English translation was published in 2014: Icelandic Baroque: Poetic Art and Erudition in the Works of Hallgrímur Pétursson.
