= List of airports by ICAO code: B =

List of airports by ICAO code: A - B - C - D - EB-EG - EH-EY - FA-FM - FN-FZ - G - H - ~~I~~ - J - KA-KH - KI-KP - KR-KZ - LA-LJ - LK-LZ - M - N - O - P - Q - R - SA-SC - SD-SH - SI - SJ - SK-SM - SN-SP - SQ - SS-SU - SV-SY - T - U - V - W - ~~X~~ - YA-YG - YH-YQ - YR-YZ - Z

== BG - Greenland ==
Also see airport category and list.

Greenland is a self-governed territory of Denmark. Many locations in Greenland have Danish names in addition to the Greenlandic names. The Danish name, when applicable, is shown in parentheses.

ICAO	IATA	Airport name	Community	Coordinates	Notes
BGAA	JEG	Aasiaat Airport	Aasiaat (Egedesminde, Ausiat)	68°43′19″N 052°47′05″W	Also BGEM
BGAG	AOQ	Aappilattoq Heliport (Avannaata)	Aappilattoq, Avannaata	72°53′13″N 055°35′46″W	
BGAK		Akunnaaq Heliport	Akunnaaq	68°44′39″N 052°20′25″W	
BGAM	AGM	Tasiilaq Heliport	Tasiilaq (Ammassalik, Angmagssalik)	65°36′44″N 037°37′06″W	
BGAP	LLU	Alluitsup Paa Heliport	Alluitsup Paa	60°27′52″N 045°34′09″W	
BGAQ	QUV	Aappilattoq Heliport (Kujalleq)	Aappilattoq, Kujalleq	60°08′54″N 044°17′13″W	
BGAR	JRK	Arsuk Heliport	Arsuk	61°10′37″N 048°25′11″W	
BGAS	QUW	Ammassivik Heliport	Ammassivik	60°35′45″N 045°22′44″W	
BGAT	QGQ	Attu Heliport	Attu	67°56′35″N 053°37′20″W	
BGBW	UAK	Narsarsuaq Airport	Narsarsuaq (Narssarssuaq)	61°09′39″N 045°25′32″W	
BGCH	JCH	Qasigiannguit Heliport (Christianshåb Heliport)	Qasigiannguit (Christianshåb)	68°49′02″N 051°10′29″W	
BGCO	CNP	Nerlerit Inaat Airport (Constable Pynt Airport)	Jameson Land	70°44′35″N 022°39′02″W	
BGET	QFG	Eqalugaarsuit Heliport	Eqalugaarsuit	60°37′11″N 045°55′02″W	
BGFD	QFN	Narsaq Kujalleq Heliport	Narsaq Kujalleq	60°00′13″N 044°39′22″W	
BGGD	JGR	Kangilinnguit Heliport (Grønnedal Heliport)	Kangilinnguit (Grønnedal)	61°13′45″N 048°05′49″W	
BGGH	GOH	Nuuk Airport	Nuuk (Godthåb)	64°11′27″N 051°40′41″W	
BGGN	JGO	Qeqertarsuaq Heliport (Godhavn Heliport)	Qeqertarsuaq (Godhavn)	69°15′05″N 053°30′53″W	
BGIA	IKE	Ikerasak Heliport	Ikerasak	70°29′53″N 051°18′11″W	
BGIG	QFI	Iginniarfik Heliport	Iginniarfik	68°08′45″N 053°10′10″W	
BGIK	QRY	Ikerasaarsuk Heliport	Ikerasaarsuk	68°08′27″N 053°26′29″W	
BGIL	XIQ	Ilimanaq Heliport	Ilimanaq	69°04′56″N 051°06′31″W	
BGIN	IUI	Innaarsuit Heliport	Innarsuit	73°12′09″N 056°00′40″W	
BGIO	QFX	Igaliku Heliport	Igaliku	60°59′27″N 045°25′19″W	
BGIS	IOQ	Isortoq Heliport	Isortoq	65°32′48″N 038°58′40″W	
BGIT	QJI	Ikamiut Heliport	Ikamiut	68°37′56″N 051°50′01″W	
BGJH	JJU	Qaqortoq Heliport (Julianehab Heliport)	Qaqortoq (Julianehab)	60°42′57″N 046°01′46″W	
BGJN	JAV	Ilulissat Airport (Jakobshavn Airport)	Ilulissat (Jakobshavn)	69°14′36″N 051°03′26″W	
BGKA		Kangaatsiaq Heliport	Kangaatsiaq	68°18′46″N 053°27′37″W	
BGKK	KUS	Kulusuk Airport	Kulusuk	65°34′25″N 037°07′25″W	
BGKL		Upernavik Kujalleq Heliport	Upernavik Kujalleq	72°09′10″N 055°31′52″W	
BGKM	KUZ	Kuummiit Heliport	Kuummiit	65°51′50″N 036°59′44″W	
BGKQ	KHQ	Kullorsuaq Heliport	Kullorsuaq	74°34′46″N 057°14′08″W	
BGKS	KGQ	Kangersuatsiaq Heliport	Kangersuatsiaq	72°22′52″N 055°32′12″W	
BGKT	QJE	Kitsissuarsuit Heliport	Kitsissuarsuit	68°51′29″N 053°07′26″W	
BGLL	IOT	Illorsuit Heliport	Illorsuit	71°14′23″N 053°33′20″W	
BGMO		Moriussaq Heliport	Moriusaq	76°45′50″N 069°59′50″W	
BGMQ	JSU	Maniitsoq Airport	Maniitsoq (Sukkertoppen)	65°24′45″N 052°56′22″W	
BGNK	QMK	Niaqornaarsuk Heliport	Niaqornaarsuk	68°14′21″N 052°50′35″W	
BGNL		Nalunaq Heliport	Nalunaq	60°21′26″N 044°49′41″W	
BGNN	JNN	Nanortalik Heliport	Nanortalik	60°08′24″N 045°13′54″W	
BGNQ	JUU	Nuugaatsiaq Heliport	Nuugaatsiaq	71°32′19″N 053°12′18″W	
BGNS	JNS	Narsaq Heliport	Narsaq	60°55′00″N 046°03′31″W	
BGNT	NIQ	Niaqornat Heliport	Niaqornat	70°47′20″N 053°39′22″W	
BGNU	NSQ	Nuussuaq Heliport	Nuussuaq	74°06′35″N 057°03′54″W	
BGPT	JFR	Paamiut Airport	Paamiut (Frederikshåb)	62°00′53″N 049°40′15″W	Also BGFH
BGQE	PQT	Qeqertaq Heliport	Qeqertaq	69°59′58″N 051°18′15″W	
BGQO	JJU	Qaqortoq Airport	Qaqortoq	60°45′57″N 046°03′54″W	
BGQQ	NAQ	Qaanaaq Airport	Qaanaaq	77°29′19″N 069°23′19″W	Also BGQA
BGQT	QJH	Qassimiut Heliport	Qassimiut	60°46′46″N 047°09′09″W	
BGSC	OBY	Ittoqqortoormiit Heliport (Scoresbysund Heliport)	Ittoqqortoormiit (Scoresbysund)	70°29′18″N 021°58′18″W	
BGSF	SFJ	Kangerlussuaq Airport (Søndre Strømfjord Airport)	Kangerlussuaq (Søndre Strømfjord)	67°01′01″N 050°41′22″W	
BGSG	SGG	Sermiligaaq Heliport	Sermiligaaq	65°54′21″N 036°22′42″W	
BGSI	SRK	Siorapaluk Heliport	Siorapaluk	77°47′11″N 070°38′18″W	
BGSO	QOQ	Saarloq Heliport	Saarloq	60°32′16″N 046°01′29″W	
BGSQ		Saqqaq Heliport	Saqqaq	70°00′41″N 051°55′56″W	
BGSS	JHS	Sisimiut Airport (Holsteinsborg Airport)	Sisimiut (Holsteinsborg)	66°57′05″N 053°43′46″W	Also BGHB
BGST	SAE	Saattut Heliport	Saattut	70°48′31″N 051°37′36″W	
BGSV	SVR	Savissivik Heliport	Savissivik	76°01′07″N 065°07′03″W	
BGTA	TQA	Tasiusaq Heliport (Avannaata)	Tasiusaq, Avannaata	73°22′23″N 056°03′37″W	
BGTL	THU	Pituffik Space Base	Pituffik, Qaanaaq	76°31′52″N 068°42′11″W	
BGTN	TQI	Tiniteqilaaq Heliport	Tiniteqilaaq	65°53′31″N 037°47′00″W	
BGTQ	XEQ	Tasiusaq Heliport (Kujalleq)	Tasiusaq, Kujalleq	60°11′38″N 044°48′42″W	
BGUK	JUV	Upernavik Airport	Upernavik	72°47′25″N 056°07′50″W	
BGUM	UMD	Uummannaq Heliport	Uummannaq	70°40′49″N 052°09′42″W	
BGUQ	JQA	Qaarsut Airport	Qaarsut	70°44′03″N 052°41′46″W	
BGUT	JUK	Ukkusissat Heliport	Ukkusissat	71°03′19″N 051°53′01″W	

== BI - Iceland ==
Also see airport category and list.

ICAO	IATA	Airport name	Community	Coordinates
BIAR	AEY	Akureyri Airport	Akureyri	65°39′40″N 018°04′20″W
BIBA		Bakki Airport	Bakki	63°33′25″N 020°08′30″W
BIBD	BIU	Bíldudalur Airport	Bíldudalur	65°38′30″N 023°32′45″W
BIBK	BJD	Bakkafjörður Airport	Bakkafjörður	66°01′19″N 014°49′28″W
BIBL	BLO	Blönduós Airport	Blönduós	65°38′45″N 020°17′15″W
BIBR	BQD	Búðardalur Airport	Búðardalur	65°04′31″N 021°48′01″W
BIBV	BXV	Breiðdalsvík Airport	Breiðdalsvík	64°47′20″N 014°02′30″W
BIDV	DJU	Djupivogur Airport	Djupivogur	64°38′35″N 014°16′40″W
BIEG	EGS	Egilsstaðir Airport	Egilsstaðir	65°17′00″N 014°24′05″W
BIFF	FAS	Fáskrúðsfjörður Airport	Fáskrúðsfjörður	64°55′55″N 014°03′00″W
BIFM	FAG	Fagurhólsmýri Airport	Fagurhólsmýri	63°52′30″N 016°38′30″W
BIGF	GUU	Grundarfjörður Airport	Grundarfjörður	64°59′30″N 023°13′20″W
BIGJ	GJR	Gjögur Airport	Gjögur	65°59′40″N 021°19′45″W
BIGR	GRY	Grímsey Airport	Grímsey	66°32′45″N 018°01′00″W
BIHK	HVK	Hólmavík Airport	Hólmavík	65°42′10″N 021°41′50″W
BIHN	HFN	Hornafjörður Airport	Höfn	64°17′44″N 015°13′38″W
BIHU	HZK	Húsavík Airport	Húsavík	65°57′08″N 017°25′33″W
BIIS	IFJ	Ísafjörður Airport	Ísafjörður	66°03′29″N 023°08′07″W
BIKF	KEF	Keflavík International Airport (Flugstöð Leifs Eiríkssonar)	Keflavík	63°59′06″N 022°36′20″W
BIKP	OPA	Kopasker Airport	Kópasker	66°18′50″N 016°27′50″W
BIKR	SAK	Sauðárkrókur Airport	Sauðárkrókur	65°43′54″N 019°34′22″W
BINF	NOR	Nordfjordur Airport	Nordfjordur	65°08′00″N 013°44′30″W
BIOF	OFJ	Ólafsfjörður Airport	Ólafsfjörður	66°04′25″N 018°40′00″W
BIPA	PFJ	Patreksfjörður Airport	Patreksfjörður	65°33′25″N 023°58′10″W
BIRF	OLI	Rif Airport	Ólafsvík	64°54′40″N 023°49′00″W
BIRG	RFN	Raufarhöfn Airport	Raufarhöfn	66°24′25″N 015°55′30″W
BIRK	RKV	Reykjavík Airport	Reykjavík	64°07′48″N 021°56′26″W
BIRL	MVA	Mývatn Airport	Reykjahlíð	65°39′20″N 016°55′00″W
BISF		Selfoss Airport	Selfoss	63°55′45″N 021°02′16″W
BISI	SIJ	Siglufjörður Airport	Siglufjörður	66°08′00″N 018°55′00″W
BIST	SYK	Stykkishólmur Airport	Stykkishólmur	65°03′35″N 022°45′30″W
BITE	TEY	Thingeyri Airport	Þingeyri	65°52′10″N 023°33′30″W
BITN	THO	Thorshofn Airport	Þórshöfn	66°13′06″N 015°20′08″W
BIVM	VEY	Vestmannaeyjar Airport	Vestmannaeyjar	63°25′30″N 020°16′45″W
BIVO	VPN	Vopnafjörður Airport	Vopnafjörður	65°43′14″N 014°51′02″W

== BK - Kosovo ==
Also see airport category and list.

ICAO	IATA	Airport name	Community	Coordinates
BKPR	PRN	Pristina International Airport (Pristina International Airport Adem Jashari)	Pristina	42°34′22″N 021°02′09″E
