= List of Icelandair destinations =

This is the list of scheduled destinations served or previously served by Icelandair and sister airline Icelandair Cargo as of September 2025.

== Destinations ==
| Country | City | Airport | Notes | Refs |
|---|---|---|---|---|
| Austria | Innsbruck | Innsbruck Airport | Seasonal | |
| Austria | Salzburg | Salzburg Airport | Seasonal | |
| Austria | Vienna | Vienna International Airport | Terminated | |
| Belgium | Brussels | Brussels Airport | Passenger | |
| Belgium | Liège | Liège Airport | Cargo | |
| Belgium | Ostend | Ostend–Bruges International Airport | Terminated | |
| Canada | Edmonton | Edmonton International Airport | Terminated | |
| Canada | Halifax | Halifax Stanfield International Airport | Seasonal | |
| Canada | Montréal | Montréal–Trudeau International Airport | Terminated | |
| Canada | Toronto | Toronto Pearson International Airport | Passenger | |
| Canada | Vancouver | Vancouver International Airport | Passenger | |
| Czech Republic | Prague | Václav Havel Airport Prague | Passenger | |
| Denmark | Billund | Billund Airport | Seasonal | |
| Denmark | Copenhagen | Copenhagen Airport | Passenger | |
| Faroe Islands | Sørvágur | Vágar Airport | Seasonal | |
| Finland | Helsinki | Helsinki Airport | Passenger | |
| France | Nice | Nice Côte d'Azur Airport | Seasonal | |
| France | Paris | Charles de Gaulle Airport | Passenger | |
| France | Paris | Orly Airport | Terminated | |
| Germany | Berlin | Berlin Brandenburg Airport | Passenger | |
| Germany | Berlin | Berlin Tegel Airport | Airport closed | |
| Germany | Düsseldorf | Düsseldorf Airport | Terminated | |
| Germany | Frankfurt | Frankfurt Airport | Passenger | |
| Germany | Hamburg | Hamburg Airport | Terminated | |
| Germany | Munich | Munich Airport | Passenger | |
| Greece | Chania | Chania International Airport | Terminated | |
| Greenland | Ilulissat | Ilulissat Airport | Seasonal | |
| Greenland | Kulusuk | Kulusuk Airport | Seasonal | |
| Greenland | Narsarsuaq | Narsarsuaq Airport | Airport closed | |
| Greenland | Nuuk | Nuuk Airport | Passenger | |
| Greenland | Qaqortoq | Qaqortoq Airport | Seasonal | |
| Iceland | Akureyri | Akureyri Airport | Passenger | |
| Iceland | Bíldudalur | Bíldudalur Airport | Terminated | |
| Iceland | Blönduós | Blönduós Airport | Terminated | |
| Iceland | Egilsstaðir | Egilsstaðir Airport | Passenger | |
| Iceland | Fagurhólsmýri | Fagurhólmýri Airport | Terminated | |
| Iceland | Fáskruðsfjörður | Fáskursfjörður Airport | Terminated | |
| Iceland | Grímsey | Grímsey Airport | Terminated | |
| Iceland | Hella | Hella Airport | Terminated | |
| Iceland | Hellissandur | Rif Airport | Terminated | |
| Iceland | Hólmavík | Hólmavík Airport | Terminated | |
| Iceland | Húsavík | Húsavík Airport | Terminated | |
| Iceland | Höfn | Hornafjörður Airport | Passenger | |
| Iceland | Ísafjörður | Ísafjörður Airport | Passenger | |
| Iceland | Kirkjubæjarklaustur | Kirkjubæjarklaustur Airport | Terminated | |
| Iceland | Kópasker | Kópasker Airport | Terminated | |
| Iceland | Neskaupstaður | Norðfjörður Airport | Terminated | |
| Iceland | Patreksfjörður | Patreksfjörður Airport | Terminated | |
| Iceland | Raufarhöfn | Raufarhöfn Airport | Terminated | |
| Iceland | Reykjavík | Keflavík International Airport | Hub | |
| Iceland | Reykjavík | Reykjavík Airport | Hub | |
| Iceland | Sauðárkrókur | Sauðárkrókur Airport | Terminated | |
| Iceland | Siglufjörður | Siglufjörður Airport | Terminated | |
| Iceland | Skógar | Skógarsandur Airport | Terminated | |
| Iceland | Vestmannaeyjar | Vestmannaeyjar Airport | Seasonal | |
| Iceland | Þingeyri | Þingeyri Airport | Terminated | |
| Iceland | Þórshöfn | Þórshöfn Airport | Terminated | |
| Ireland | Dublin | Dublin Airport | Passenger | |
| Israel | Tel Aviv | Ben Gurion Airport | Terminated | |
| Italy | Milan | Milan Malpensa Airport | Seasonal | |
| Italy | Rome | Leonardo da Vinci–Fiumicino Airport | Passenger | |
| Italy | Venice | Venice Marco Polo Airport | Seasonal | |
| Italy | Verona | Verona Villafranca Airport | Seasonal | |
| Netherlands | Amsterdam | Amsterdam Airport Schiphol | Passenger | |
| Luxembourg | Luxembourg City | Luxembourg Airport | Terminated | |
| Norway | Bergen | Bergen Airport, Flesland | Seasonal | |
| Norway | Oslo | Oslo Airport, Gardermoen | Passenger | |
| Norway | Stavanger | Stavanger Airport | Terminated | |
| Norway | Trondheim | Trondheim Airport | Terminated | |
| Portugal | Lisbon | Lisbon Airport | Passenger | |
| Russia | Saint Petersburg | Pulkovo Airport | Terminated | |
| Spain | Alicante | Alicante–Elche Miguel Hernández Airport | Passenger | |
| Spain | Barcelona | Josep Tarradellas Barcelona–El Prat Airport | Passenger | |
| Spain | Las Palmas | Gran Canaria Airport | Seasonal | |
| Spain | Madrid | Madrid–Barajas Airport | Terminated | |
| Spain | Málaga | Málaga Airport | Passenger | |
| Spain | Tenerife | Tenerife South Airport | Passenger | |
| Sweden | Gothenburg | Göteborg Landvetter Airport | Seasonal | |
| Sweden | Stockholm | Stockholm Arlanda Airport | Passenger | |
| Switzerland | Geneva | Geneva Airport | Seasonal | |
| Switzerland | Zürich | Zurich Airport | Passenger | |
| Turkey | Istanbul | Istanbul Airport | Seasonal | |
| United Kingdom | Aberdeen | Aberdeen Airport | Terminated | |
| United Kingdom | Belfast | George Best Belfast City Airport | Terminated | |
| United Kingdom | Birmingham | Birmingham Airport | Terminated | |
| United Kingdom | East Midlands | East Midlands Airport | Terminated | |
| United Kingdom | Edinburgh | Edinburgh Airport | Passenger | |
| United Kingdom | Glasgow | Glasgow Airport | Passenger | |
| United Kingdom | London | Gatwick Airport | Passenger | |
| United Kingdom | London | Heathrow Airport | Passenger | |
| United Kingdom | Manchester | Manchester Airport | Passenger | |
| United States | Anchorage | Ted Stevens Anchorage International Airport | Terminated | |
| United States | Baltimore | Baltimore/Washington International Airport | Passenger | |
| United States | Boston | Logan International Airport | Passenger | |
| United States | Chicago | O'Hare International Airport | Passenger | |
| United States | Cleveland | Cleveland Hopkins International Airport | Terminated | |
| United States | Dallas | Dallas Fort Worth International Airport | Terminated | |
| United States | Denver | Denver International Airport | Passenger | |
| United States | Detroit | Detroit Metropolitan Airport | Seasonal | |
| United States | Fort Lauderdale | Fort Lauderdale–Hollywood International Airport | Terminated | |
| United States | Kansas City | Kansas City International Airport | Terminated | |
| United States | Miami | Miami International Airport | Seasonal | |
| United States | Minneapolis | Minneapolis–Saint Paul International Airport | Passenger | |
| United States | Nashville | Nashville International Airport | Seasonal | |
| United States | New York City | John F. Kennedy International Airport | Passenger | |
| United States | Newark | Newark Liberty International Airport | Passenger | |
| United States | Orlando | Orlando International Airport | Passenger | |
| United States | Orlando | Orlando Sanford International Airport | Terminated | |
| United States | Philadelphia | Philadelphia International Airport | Terminated | |
| United States | Pittsburgh | Pittsburgh International Airport | Seasonal | |
| United States | Portland (OR) | Portland International Airport | Seasonal | |
| United States | Raleigh | Raleigh–Durham International Airport | Passenger | |
| United States | San Francisco | San Francisco International Airport | Terminated | |
| United States | Seattle | Seattle–Tacoma International Airport | Passenger | |
| United States | Tampa | Tampa International Airport | Terminated | |
| United States | Washington, D.C. | Dulles International Airport | Passenger | |
