= List of airports in Iceland =

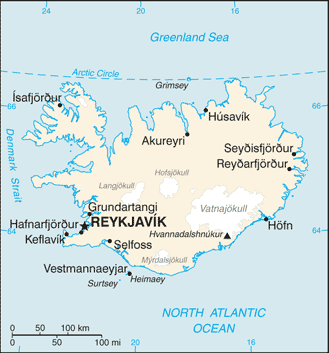
Map of Iceland

Map of Iceland with public airports

This is a list of airports in Iceland. There are no railways in Iceland. Driving from Reykjavík to Akureyri takes 4–5 hours compared to 45 minutes flight time, driving from Reykjavík to Egilsstaðir takes 9 hours compared to 1 hour flight time.

== Airports ==
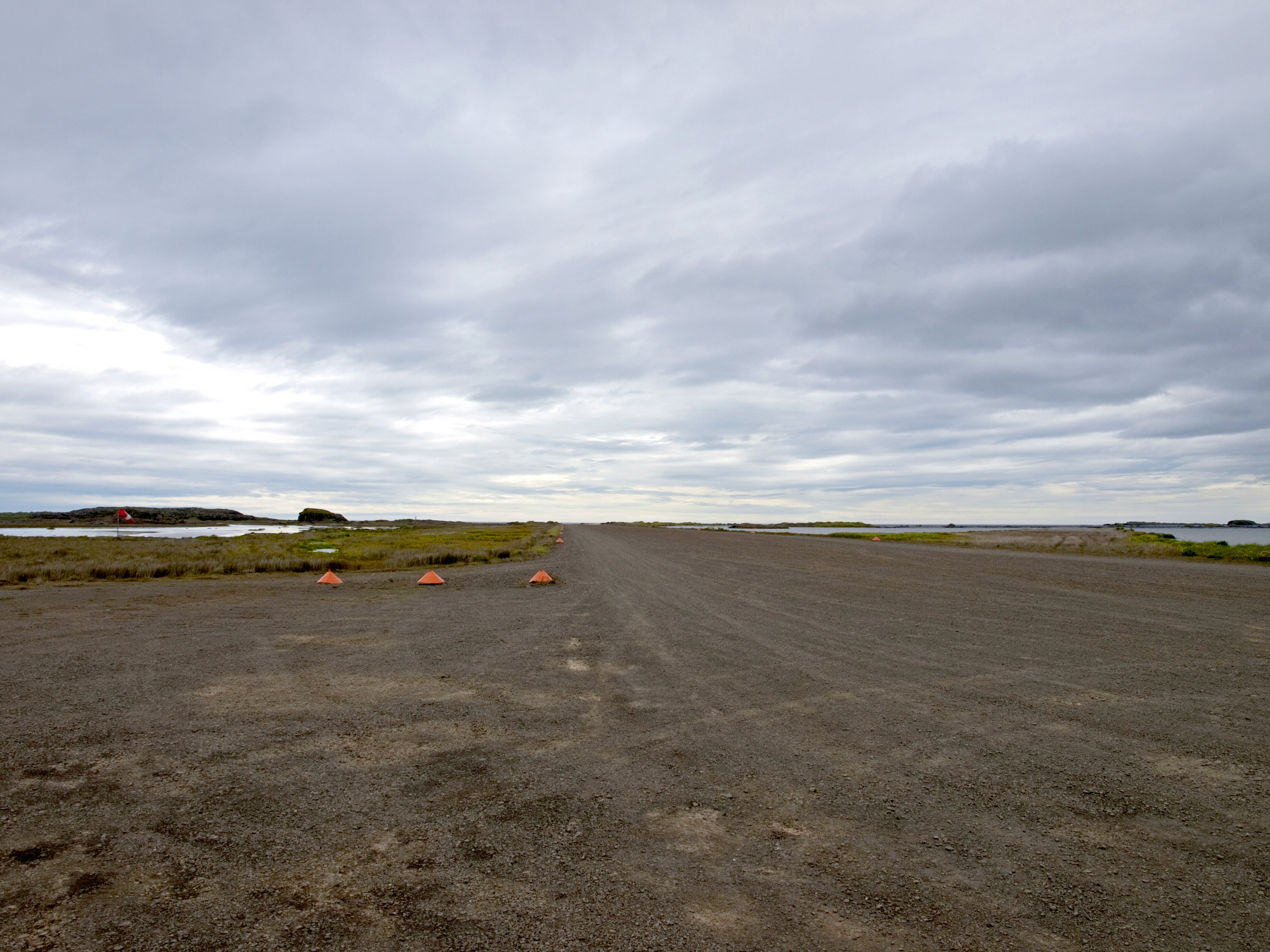
The landing strip of Djúpivogur Airport.

Airport names shown in bold have scheduled passenger service on commercial airlines.

Location served	ICAO	IATA	Airport name	Longest runway(m)
Akureyri	BIAR	AEY	**Akureyri Airport**	2,400
Bakki	BIBA	none	Bakki Airport	1,000
Bíldudalur	BIBD	BIU	**Bíldudalur Airport**	1,000
Blönduós	BIBL	BLO	Blönduós Airport	
Breiðdalsvík	BIBV	BXV	Breiðdalsvík Airport	
Djúpivogur	BIDV	DJU	Djúpivogur Airport	
Egilsstaðir	BIEG	EGS	**Egilsstaðir Airport**	2,000
Fagurhólsmýri	BIFM	FAG	Fagurhólsmýri Airport	
Fáskrúðsfjörður	BIFF	FAS	Fáskrúðsfjörður Airport	
Gjögur	BIGJ	GJR	**Gjögur Airport**	960
Grímsey	BIGR	GRY	**Grímsey Airport**	1,036
Grundarfjörður	BIGF	GUU	Grundarfjörður Airport	
Hólmavík	BIHK	HVK	Hólmavík Airport	
Höfn	BIHN	HFN	**Hornafjörður Airport**	1,500
Húsavík	BIHU	HZK	Húsavík Airport	1,605
Ísafjörður	BIIS	IFJ	**Ísafjörður Airport**	1,400
Keflavík	BIKF	KEF	**Keflavík International Airport**	3,065
Kópasker	BIKP	OPA	Kópasker Airport	
Reykjahlíð	BIRL	MVA	Mývatn Airport	
Norðfjörður	BINF	NOR	Norðfjörður Airport	
Ólafsfjörður	BIOF	OFJ	Ólafsfjörður Airport	
Patreksfjörður	BIPA	PFJ	Patreksfjörður Airport	
Raufarhöfn	BIRG	RFN	Raufarhöfn Airport	
Reykjavík	BIRK	RKV	**Reykjavík Airport**	1,566
Rif	BIRF	OLI	Rif Airport	1,200
Sauðárkrókur	BIKR	SAK	Sauðárkrókur Airport	1,887
Selfoss	BISF	SEL	Selfoss Airport	1,100
Siglufjörður	BISI	SIJ	Siglufjörður Airport	
Stykkishólmur	BIST	SYK	Stykkishólmur Airport	
Þingeyri (Thingeyri)	BITE	TEY	Þingeyri Airport	
Þórshöfn (Thorshofn)	BITN	THO	**Þórshöfn Airport**	1,199
Vestmannaeyjar	BIVM	VEY	**Vestmannaeyjar Airport**	1,199
Vopnafjörður	BIVO	VPN	**Vopnafjörður Airport**	885

Not listed are former military airports and airbases Naval Air Station Keflavik (which is now Keflavik International Airport), RAF Reykjavik (which is now Reykjavik Airport) and RAF Kaldadarnes (which is now abandoned). Also not listed are smaller airfields like Sandskeið glider airfield.

== See also ==
- Transport in Iceland
- List of airports by ICAO code: B#BI - Iceland
- Wikipedia: Airline destination lists: Europe#Iceland
- List of the largest airports in the Nordic countries
