= BIPA =

Bipa or BIPA may refer to:

== Bipa ==
- Bipa, korean musical instrument
- Bipa, Guinea

== BIPA ==
- Biometric Information Privacy Act, Illinois law
- BIPA (company), Austrian retailer
- BIPA Odesa, Ukrainian basketball club
- British Indian Psychiatric Association
- British–Irish Parliamentary Assembly
- Patreksfjörður Airport, Iceland (by ICAO code)
