= Selfoss =

Selfoss may refer to:

- Selfoss (town), Iceland
- UMF Selfoss, a football club based in Selfoss
  - Selfoss men's football
  - Selfoss women's football
- Selfoss (waterfall), Iceland
- Selfoss Airport
- Selfoss earthquake
