= PFJ =

PFJ may refer to:

- Patreksfjörður Airport (IATA code)
- Petits Frères de Jésus, French name of Little Brothers of Jesus
- People's Front of Judea, a fictional organisation in the film Monty Python's Life of Brian
