= GUU =

Guu or GUU may refer to:

- Glasgow University Union
- Grundarfjörður Airport, in Iceland
- a codon for the amino acid valine
- Yanomamö language
- Guu, a character in Haré+Guu, a manga and anime series
