= Stykkishólmur Airport =

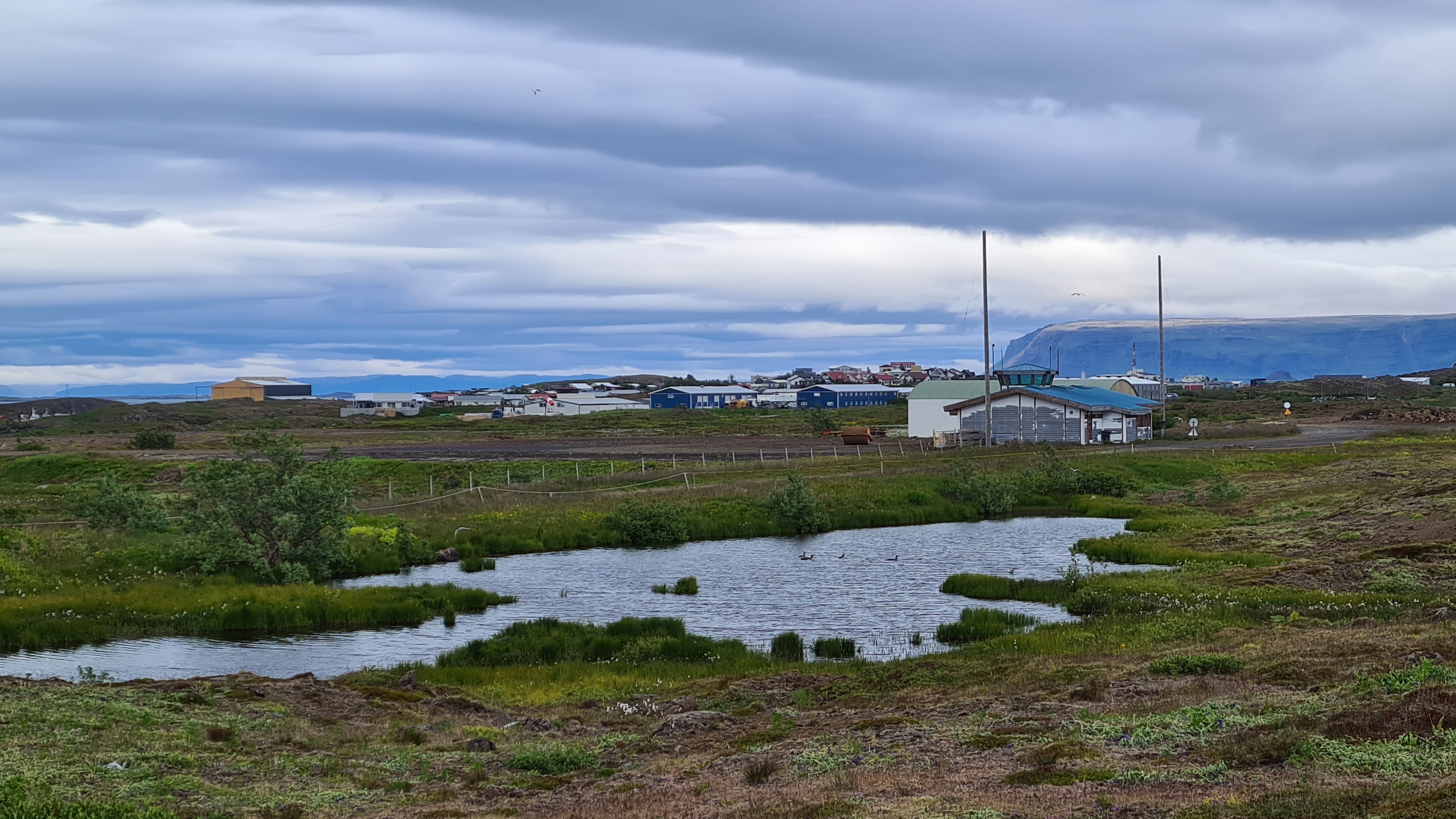
- IATA: SYK; ICAO: BIST

Summary
- Airport type: Public
- Serves: Stykkishólmur
- Elevation AMSL: 42 ft (13 m)
- Coordinates: 65°03′35″N 22°45′30″W

Map
- Location of the airport in Iceland

Runways
| Direction | Length | | Surface |
| Direction | m | ft | Surface |
|---|---|---|---|
| 07/25 | 1,114 | 3,655 | Asphalt |
- Source: GCM Google Maps

Stykkishólmur Airport (IATA: SYK, ICAO: BIST) is an airport serving Stykkishólmur, Iceland. There are no scheduled flights.

There has been scheduled flights to Reykjavik during parts of the 20th century, but improved roads (especially the Hvalfjörður Tunnel) has made flights less needed. The road distance to Reykjavik is 171 kilometres (106 mi).

== See also ==
- List of airports in Iceland
- Transport in Iceland
