= Mývatn Airport =

Airport in Iceland

Mývatn Airport Reykjahlíð Airport
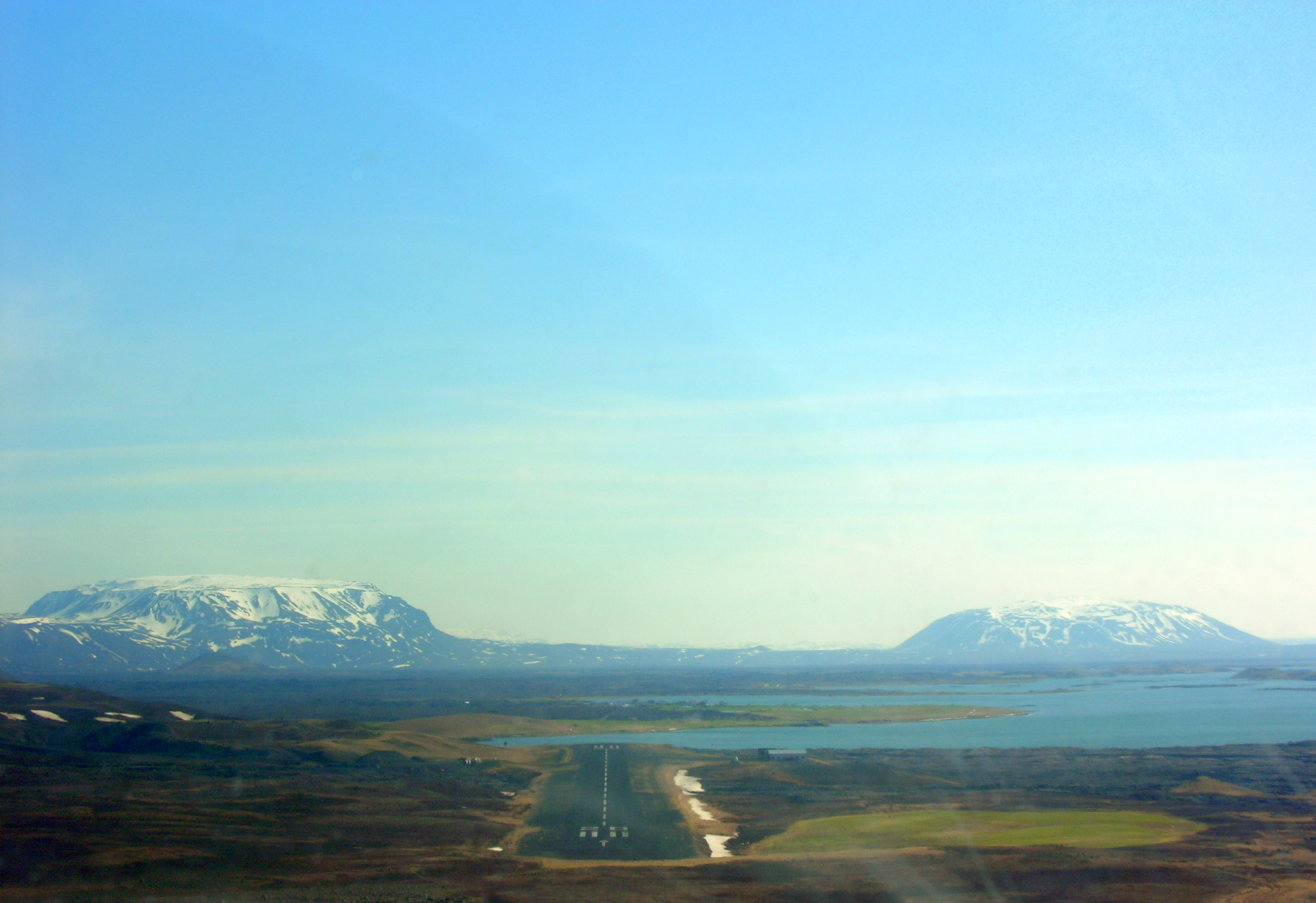
- IATA: MVA; ICAO: BIRL

Summary
- Airport type: Public
- Serves: Reykjahlíð
- Elevation AMSL: 1,010 ft / 308 m
- Coordinates: 65°39′20″N 16°55′00″W

Map
- Location of the airport in Iceland

Runways
| Direction | Length | | Surface |
| Direction | m | ft | Surface |
|---|---|---|---|
| 02/20 | 1,055 | 3,461 | Asphalt |
- Source: Google Maps GCM

Mývatn Airport (IATA: MVA, ICAO: BIRL) is an airport serving Reykjahlíð, Iceland.

The Lake Mývatn area is a nature preserve of volcanic origin.

== Statistics ==
=== Passengers and movements ===
| | Number of passengers (Note: Number of passengers including domestic, international and transit.) | Number of movements (Note: Number of movements represents total takeoffs and landings during that year.) |
|---|---|---|
| 2003 | 1,918 | 638 |
| 2004 | 2,106 | 754 |
| 2005 | 1,242 | 452 |
| 2006 | 1,932 | 802 |
| 2007 | 1,768 | 766 |
| 2008 | 2,026 | 882 |
| 2009 | 1,346 | 630 |
| 2010 | 1,442 | 716 |
| 2011 | 1,912 | 824 |
| 2012 | 2,272 | 920 |
| 2013 | 2,072 | 614 |
| 2014 | 4,064 | 842 |
| 2015 | 1,670 | 470 |
| 2016 | 1,540 | 501 |
| 2017 | 1,370 | 460 |
| 2018 | 794 | 278 |
| 2019 | 22 | 2 |

== See also ==
- Transport in Iceland
- List of airports in Iceland
