= Strandabyggð =

- Municipality
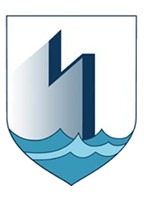
- Coat of arms

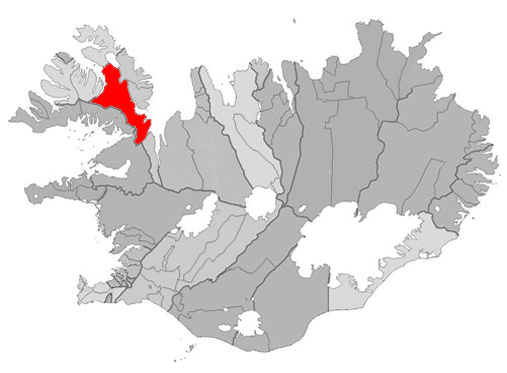
- Location of the municipality

- Location within Iceland
- Coordinates: 65.706700°N 21.665320°W
- Country: Iceland
- Region: Westfjords
- Constituency: Northwest Constituency
- Established: 10.06.2006

Government
  - Manager: Þorgeir Pálsson

Area
  - Total: 1,906 km^{2} (736 sq mi)

Population
  - Total: 449
  - Density: 0.24/km^{2} (0.62/sq mi)
- Postal code(s): 510, 512
- Municipal number: 4911
- Website: strandabyggd.is

Strandabyggð (Icelandic pronunciation: [ˈstrantaˌpɪɣθ]) is a municipality, formed in 2006 when the districts Hólmavík and Broddaneshrepp merged, located in northwestern Iceland.
