= Bakki Airport =

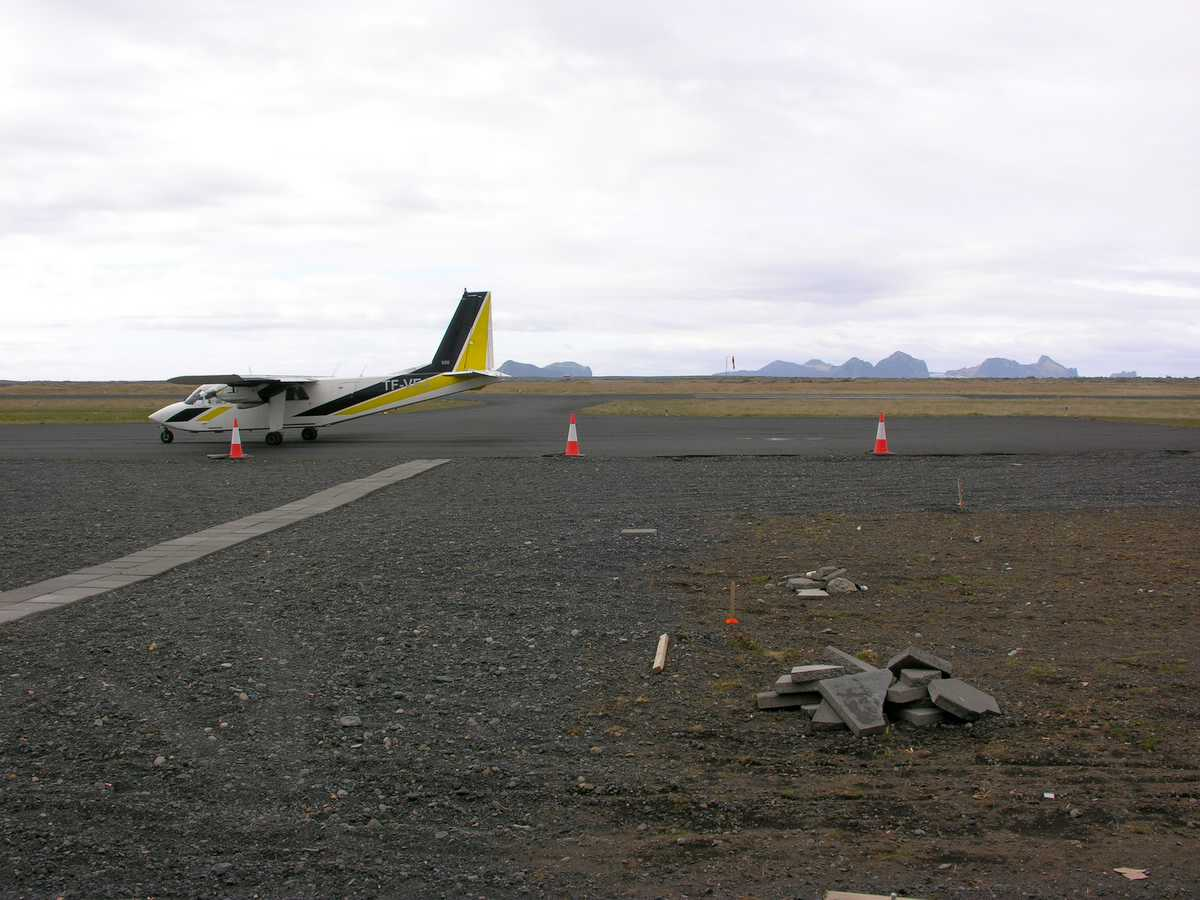
- IATA: none; ICAO: BIBA

Summary
- Airport type: Public
- Operator: Isavia
- Serves: Bakki, Iceland
- Elevation AMSL: 45 ft / 14 m
- Coordinates: 63°33′25″N 20°08′30″W

Map
- Location of Airport in Iceland

Runways
Direction	Length		Surface
Direction	m	ft	Surface
12/30	1,000	3,281	Asphalt
03/21	840	2,756	Grass
- Source: AIP Iceland Google Maps GCM

Bakki Airport (ICAO: BIBA) is an airport on the southern coast of Iceland, used mainly for short-haul flights to and from the Westman Islands.

== Statistics ==
=== Passengers and movements ===
	Number of passengers (Note: Number of passengers including domestic, international and transit.)	Number of movements (Note: Number of movements represents total takeoffs and landings during that year.)
2003	25,615	9,980
2004	27,416	11,204
2005	28,957	11,018
2006	28,222	9,774
2007	24,475	9,728
2008	21,884	9,634
2009	21,513	7,704
2010	2,211	2,002
2014	282	288
2015	231	162
2016	423	366
2017	230	142
2018	1,036	455
2019	0	0
2020	0	0
2021	0	0

== See also ==
- Transport in Iceland
- List of airports in Iceland
