= Strandir =

Region in Iceland

Coordinates: 66.024297°N 21.549164°W

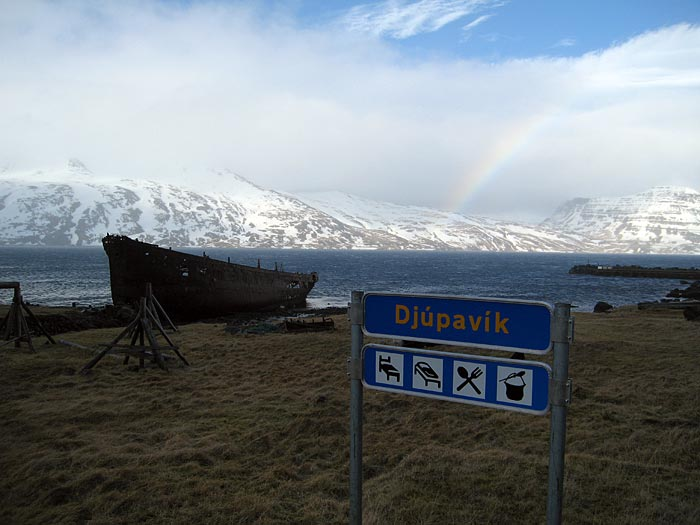
Djúpavík, Strandir

Strandir (Icelandic pronunciation: [ˈstrantɪr̥]) is the eastern coastal region of Iceland's Westfjords (Strandasýsla). It encompasses 3,500 square kilometers and is considered remote and difficult to access. It has a population of around 800 people, with the largest community being Hólmavík. Historically, it has relied on fishing and sheep farming to support its economies. The herring stocks of the region, once some of the best in the country, collapsed in the 1950s. More recently, though late relative to the broader region, it has sought tourism industries.
