= Ólafsfjörður Airport =

- IATA: OFJ; ICAO: BIOF

Summary
- Airport type: Public
- Serves: Ólafsfjörður
- Elevation AMSL: 32 ft / 10 m
- Coordinates: 66°04′25″N 18°40′00″W

Map
- Location of the airport in Iceland

Runways
Direction	Length		Surface
Direction	m	ft	Surface
05/23	1,005	3,297	Grass
- Source: Google Maps GCM

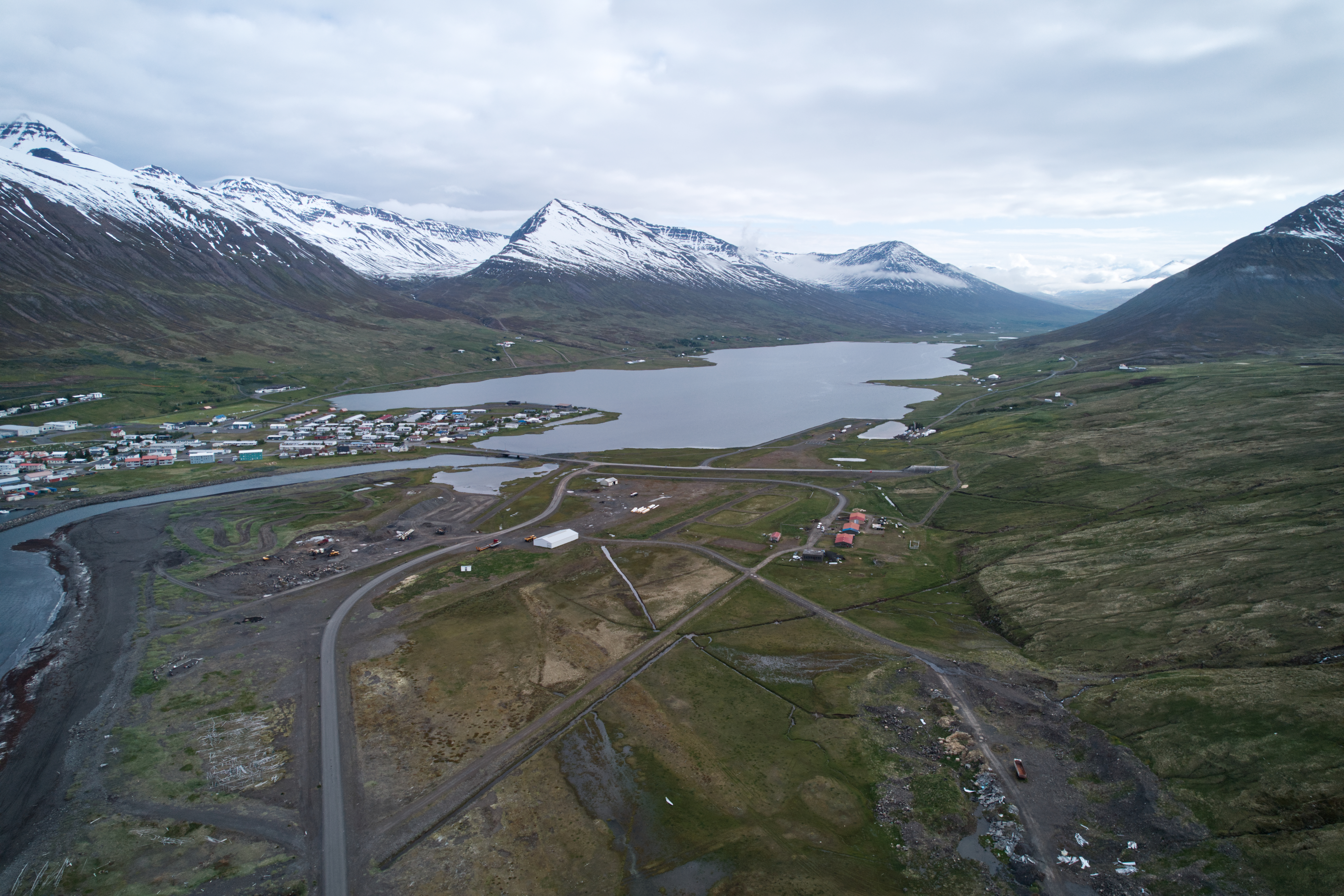
Ólafsfjarðarflugvöllur (2025)

Ólafsfjörður Airport (IATA: OFJ, ICAO: BIOF) is an airport serving Ólafsfjörður, Iceland.

== See also ==
- Transport in Iceland
- List of airports in Iceland
