= Djúpivogur Airport =

Airport serving Djúpivogur, Iceland

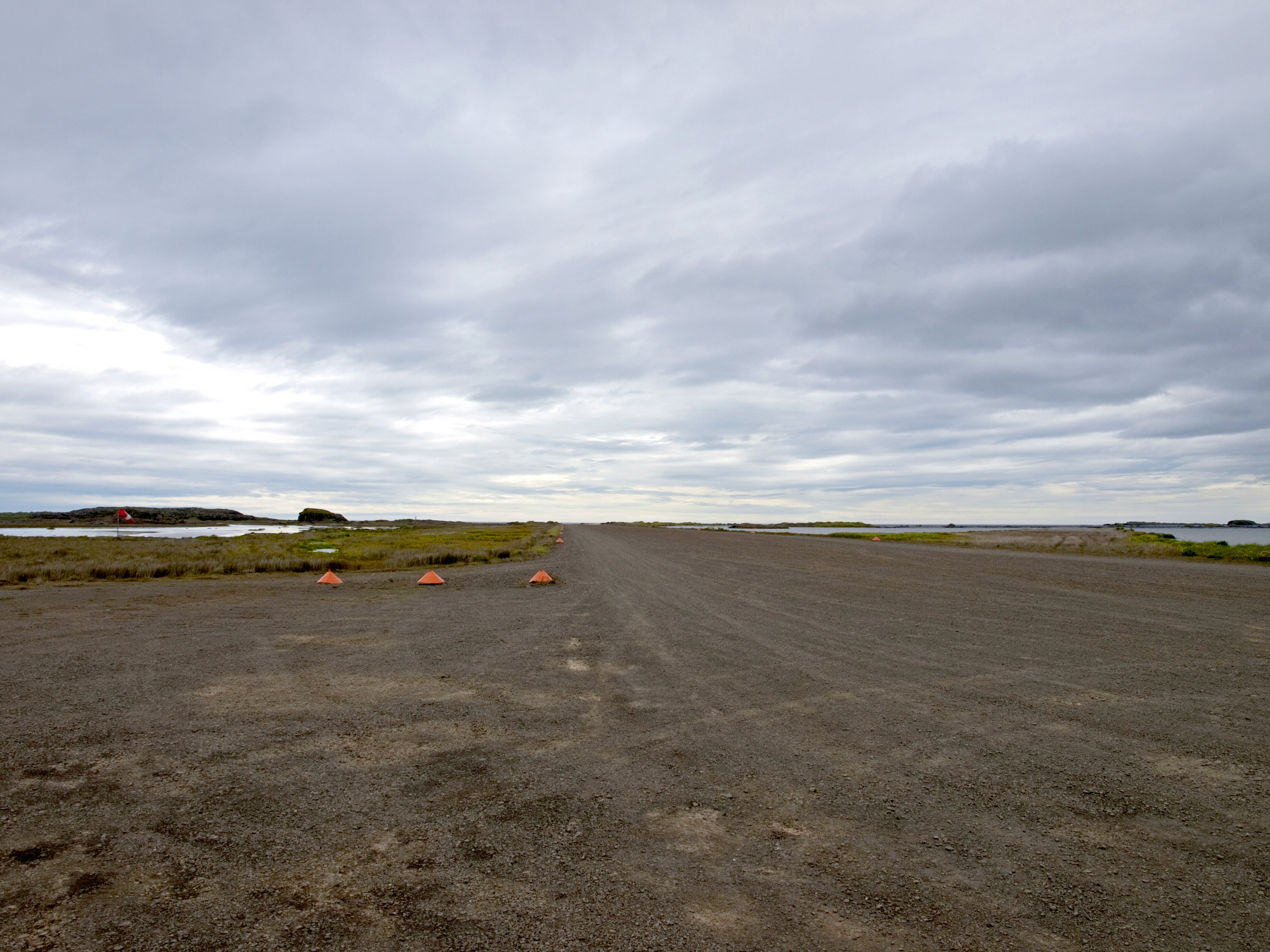
- IATA: DJU; ICAO: BIDV

Summary
- Airport type: Public
- Elevation AMSL: 10 ft / 3 m
- Coordinates: 64°38′35″N 14°16′40″W

Map
- Location of the airport in Iceland

Runways
Direction	Length		Surface
Direction	m	ft	Surface
18/36	814	2,671	Gravel
- Source: GCM Google Maps

Djúpivogur Airport (IATA: DJU, ICAO: BIDV) is an airport serving Djúpivogur, Iceland.

== See also ==
- Transport in Iceland
- List of airports in Iceland
