= Arsuk Heliport =

- IATA: none; ICAO: BGAR

Summary
- Airport type: Public
- Operator: Greenland Airport Authority (Mittarfeqarfiit)
- Serves: Arsuk, Greenland
- Elevation AMSL: 72 ft / 22 m
- Coordinates: 61°10′37″N 48°25′11″W

Map
- Location in Greenland

Helipads
Number	Length		Surface
Number	m	ft	Surface
1	40 × 40	130 × 130	Gravel
- Source: Danish AIS

Arsuk Heliport (ICAO: BGAR) is a heliport in Arsuk, a village in the Sermersooq municipality in southwestern Greenland. The heliport is considered a helistop because it does not have a terminal building.

== Location and facilities ==
Arsuk Heliport is about 1.5 km (0.93 mi) east of the village, is at an altitude of 22 meters and has a gravel-covered circular landing area with a diameter of 40 m.

== Airlines and destinations ==
Airlines	Destinations
Air Greenland (settlement flights)	Qaqortoq

Arsuk Heliport is served by Air Greenland, which has seasonal regular flights to Qaqortoq Heliport. From there, Narsarsuaq Airport can be reached via the Narsaq Heliport.
