= Húsavík Airport =

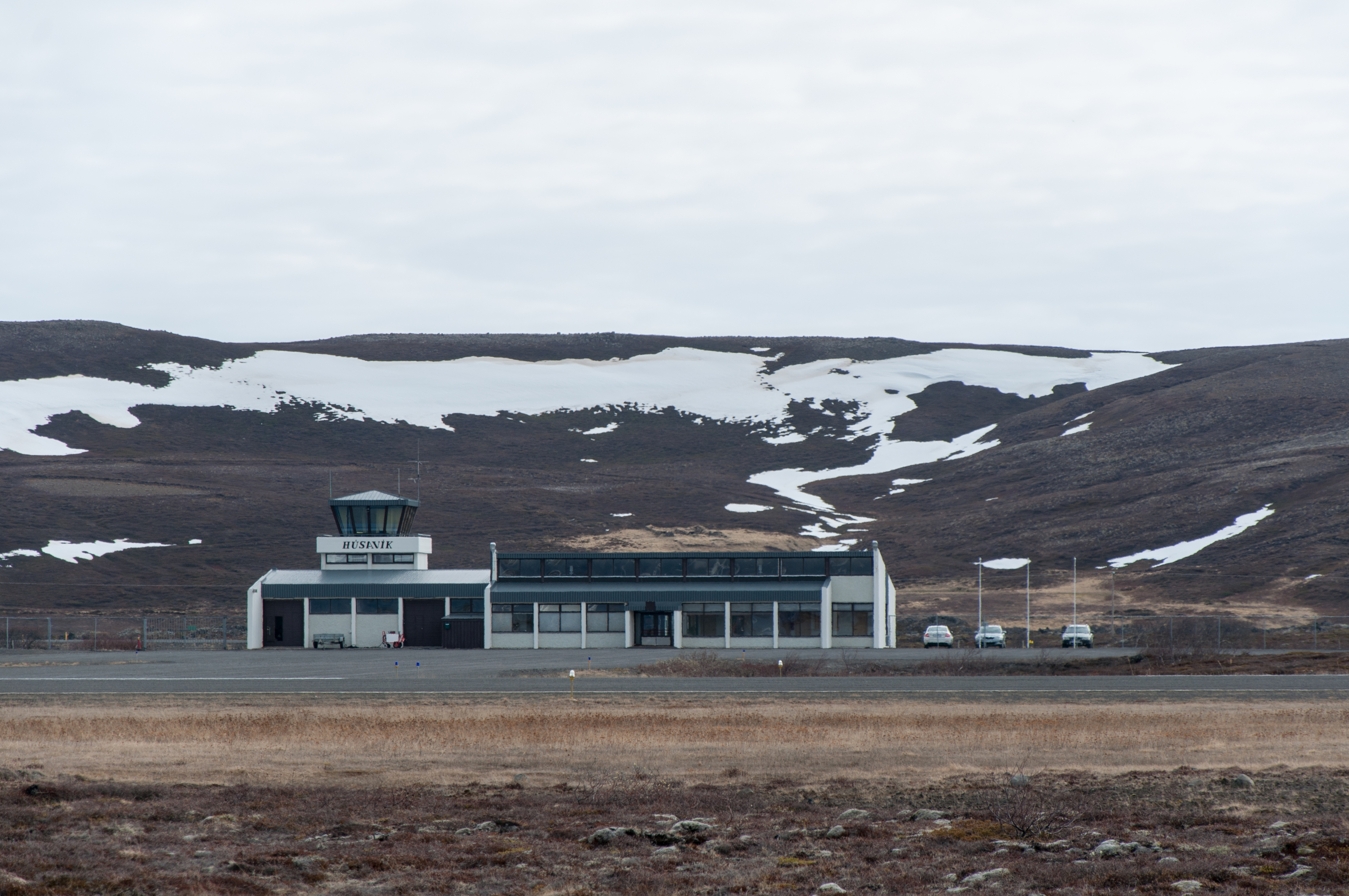
- IATA: HZK; ICAO: BIHU

Summary
- Airport type: Public
- Operator: Isavia
- Location: Húsavík, Iceland
- Elevation AMSL: 48 ft / 15 m
- Coordinates: 65°57′08″N 17°25′33″W
- Website: http://www.husavikairport.com/

Map
- Location of airport in Iceland

Runways
Direction	Length		Surface
Direction	m	ft	Surface
03/21	1,605	5,266	Asphalt

Statistics (2016)
- Passengers: 20,394
- Source: DAFIF GCM Húsavík Airport

Húsavík Airport (Icelandic: Húsavíkurflugvöllur [ˈhuːsaˌviːkʏrˌflʏɣˌvœtlʏr̥], regionally also [-ˌviːkʰʏr-]) (IATA: HZK, ICAO: BIHU) is an airport serving Húsavík, Iceland. The runway is 10.4 kilometres (6.5 mi) southwest of the town. As of March 2025, there are no scheduled services to Húsavík Airport.

The opening of the Vaðlaheiðargöng tunnel in 2018 shortened the distance by 16 km to Akureyri (and Akureyri International Airport) to only 75km, around a one-hour drive. This led to scheduled services to Húsavik Airport being cut back and scheduled Eagle Air services to Reykjavik Airport ceased in April 2024. In 2024, the Icelandic government introduced a subsidised seasonal winter service to Húsavik Airport, running from December to March 2025 operated by Norlandair. Since March 2025, there have been no scheduled services. The airport continues to serve general aviation and medivac flights.

The Gardur non-directional beacon (Ident: GA) (4.1 nautical miles) and the Husavik non-directional beacon (Ident: HS) (1.1 nautical miles) are located off the threshold of runway 03.

== Statistics ==
=== Passengers and movements ===
	Number of passengers (Note: Number of passengers including domestic, international and transit.)	Number of movements (Note: Number of movements represents total takeoffs and landings during that year.)
2015	11,484	1,262
2016	20,394	1,768
2017	17,975	1,571
2018	14,310	1,523
2019	11,633	1,314
2020	5,736	686
2021	6,871	800

== See also ==
- Transport in Iceland
- List of airports in Iceland
