= Selfoss Airport =

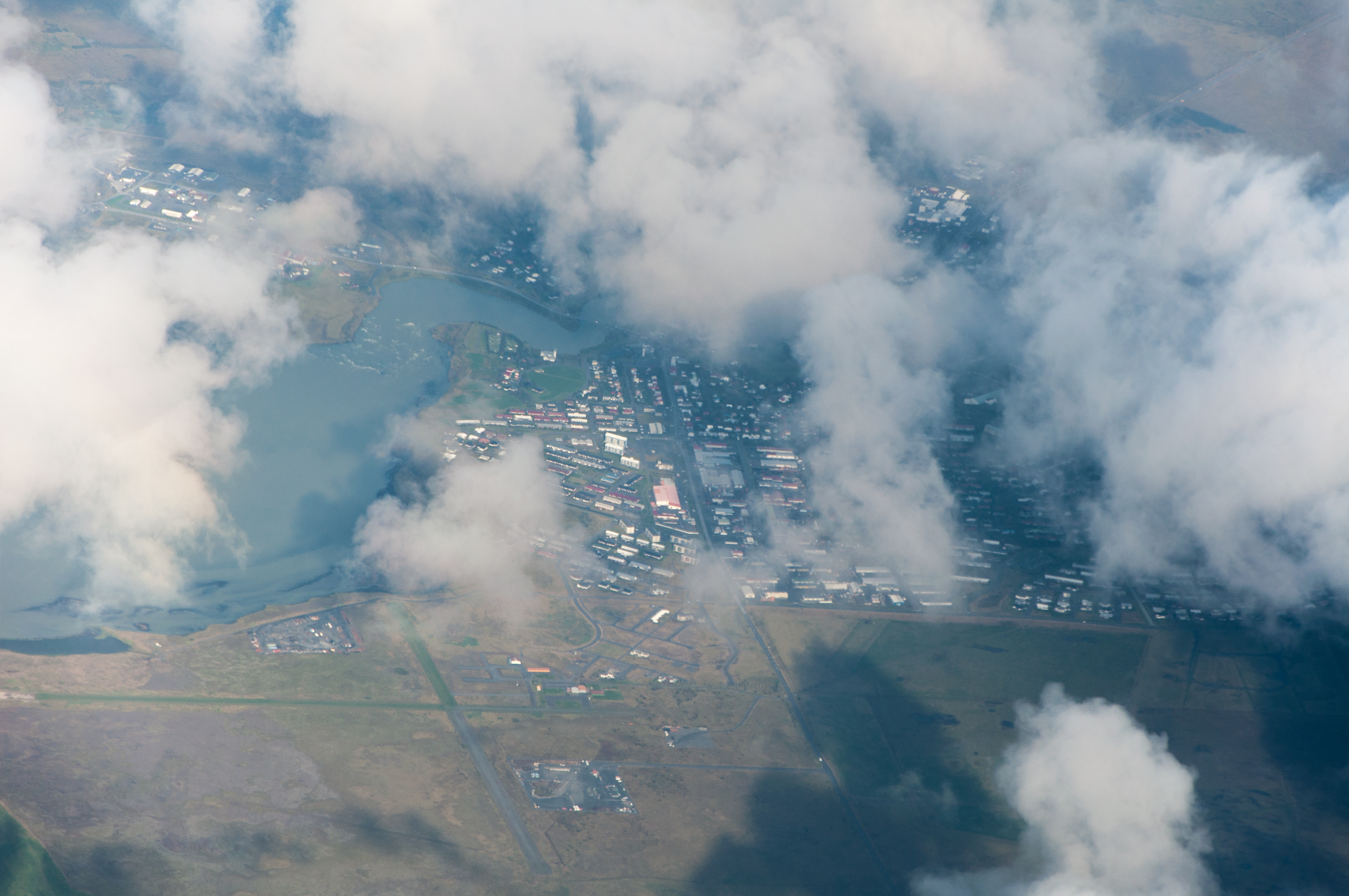
- IATA: none; ICAO: BISF

Summary
- Airport type: Private
- Serves: Selfoss, Iceland
- Elevation AMSL: 45 ft / 14 m
- Coordinates: 63°55′45″N 21°02′16″W

Map

Runways
Direction	Length		Surface
Direction	m	ft	Surface
05/23	1,100	3,609	Grass
15/33	1,080	3,543	Grass
- Source: AIP Iceland Google Maps

Selfoss Airport (ICAO: BISF) is an airport serving Selfoss, a town on the banks of Ölfusá river in the Árborg municipality in southern Iceland. Selfoss Airport is privately owned.

The Selfoss non-directional beacon (Ident: SE) is located on the field.

== See also ==
- Transport in Iceland
- List of airports in Iceland
