= Fáskrúðsfjörður Airport =

- IATA: FAS; ICAO: BIFF

Summary
- Airport type: Public
- Serves: Fáskrúðsfjörður
- Elevation AMSL: 15 ft / 5 m
- Coordinates: 64°55′55″N 14°03′00″W

Map
- Location of the airport in Iceland

Runways
Direction	Length		Surface
Direction	m	ft	Surface
13/31	805	2,641	Asphalt
- Source: Google Maps GCM

Fáskrúðsfjörður Airport (IATA: FAS, ICAO: BIFF) is an airport serving Fáskrúðsfjörður, Iceland.

== See also ==
- Transport in Iceland
- List of airports in Iceland
