= Grundarfjörður Airport =

- IATA: GUU; ICAO: BIGF

Summary
- Airport type: Public
- Serves: Grundarfjörður
- Elevation AMSL: 17 ft / 5 m
- Coordinates: 64°59′30″N 23°13′20″W

Map
- Location of the airport in Iceland

Runways
Direction	Length		Surface
Direction	m	ft	Surface
05/23	895	2,936	Grass
- Source: Google Maps GCM

Grundarfjörður Airport (IATA: GUU, ICAO: BIGF) is an airport serving Grundarfjörður, Iceland. The airport is on a peninsula 8 kilometres (5.0 mi) north of the town.

== See also ==
- Transport in Iceland
- List of airports in Iceland
