= Blönduós Airport =

Blönduós Airport Hjaltabakki Airport
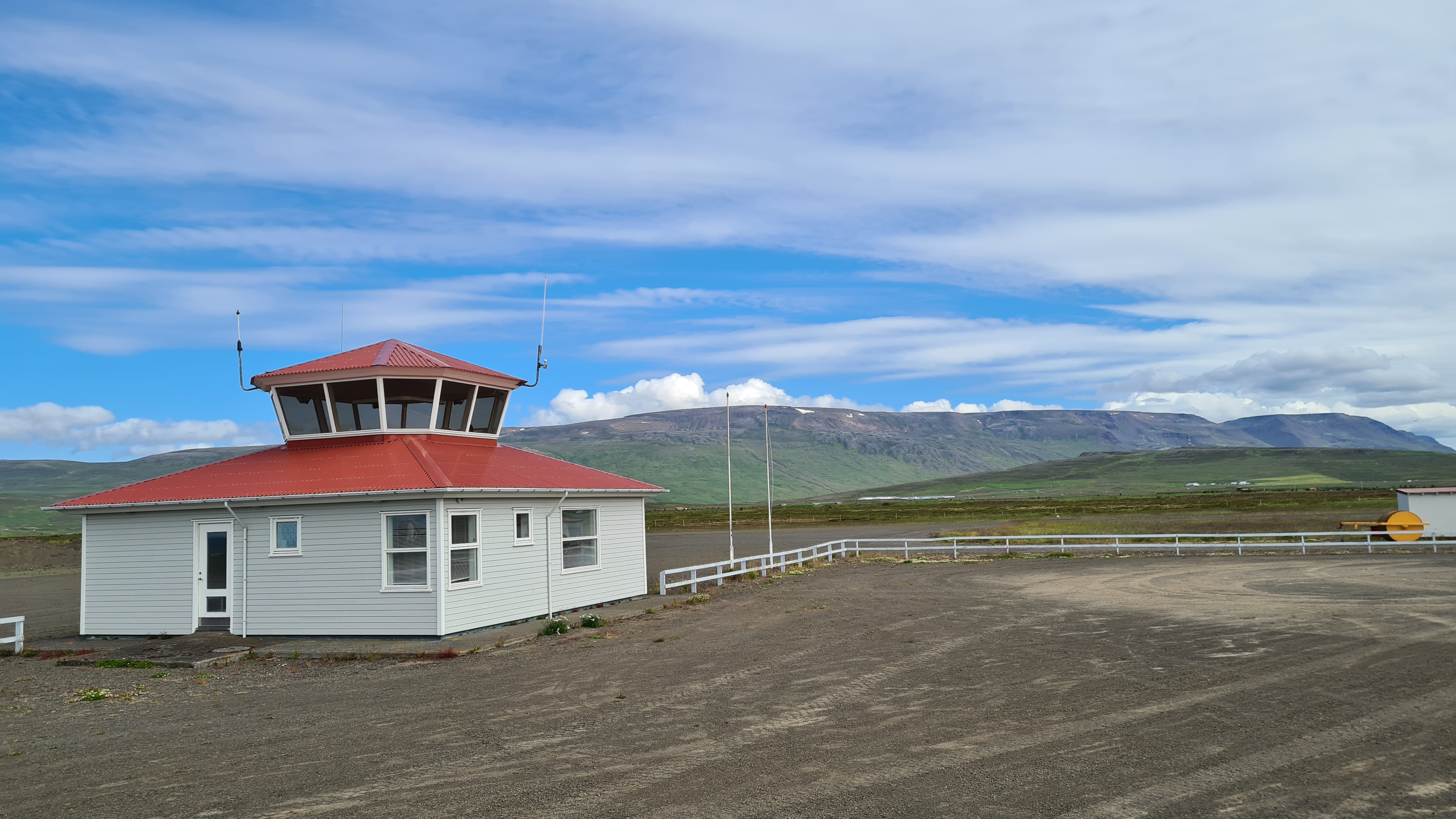
- IATA: BLO; ICAO: BIBL

Summary
- Airport type: Public
- Owner/Operator: Isavia
- Elevation AMSL: 131 ft / 40 m
- Coordinates: 65°38′45″N 20°17′15″W

Map
- Location of the airport in Iceland

Runways
Direction	Length		Surface
Direction	m	ft	Surface
03/21	970	3,182	Gravel
- Source: Isavia Google Maps GCM

Blönduós Airport (IATA: BLO, ICAO: BIBL) is an airport serving Blönduós, Iceland.

There are no scheduled flights. It is occasionally used for air ambulances. The nearest airport with scheduled flights is Akureyri Airport, 148 km from Blönduós.

The Blonduos non-directional beacon (Ident: BL) is 2.5 nautical miles north of the runway 21 threshold.

== See also ==
- Transport in Iceland
- List of airports in Iceland
