= Norðfjörður Airport =

Norðfjörður Airport Norðfjörður Neskapstad Airport
- IATA: NOR; ICAO: BINF

Summary
- Airport type: Public
- Serves: Neskaupstaður
- Elevation AMSL: 13 ft / 4 m
- Coordinates: 65°08′00″N 13°44′30″W

Map
- Location of the airport in Iceland

Runways
Direction	Length		Surface
Direction	m	ft	Surface
08/26	1,160	3,806	Asphalt
- Source: Google Maps GCM

Norðfjörður Airport (IATA: NOR, ICAO: BINF) is an airport serving Neskaupstaður, Iceland. The town is on the Norðfjörður fjord.

The Nordfjordur non-directional beacon (Ident: NF) is located on the field.

== Statistics ==
=== Passengers and movements ===
	Number of passengers (Note: Number of passengers including domestic, international and transit.)	Number of movements (Note: Number of movements represents total takeoffs and landings during that year.)
2017	41	52
2018	18	66
2019	40	56
2020	49	62
2021	103	122

== See also ==
- Transport in Iceland
- List of airports in Iceland
