= Kópasker Airport =

- IATA: OPA; ICAO: BIKP

Summary
- Airport type: Public
- Serves: Kópasker
- Elevation AMSL: 20 ft / 6 m
- Coordinates: 66°18′50″N 16°27′50″W

Map
- Location of the airport in Iceland

Runways
Direction	Length		Surface
Direction	m	ft	Surface
02/20	1,070	3,510	Paved
12/30	856	2,808	Paved
- Sources: Google Maps GCM

Kópasker Airport (IATA: OPA, ICAO: BIKP) is an airport serving the coastal village of Kópasker, Iceland.

== See also ==
- Transport in Iceland
- List of airports in Iceland
