= Sauðárkrókur Airport =

Sauðárkrókur Airport Alexandersflugvöllur
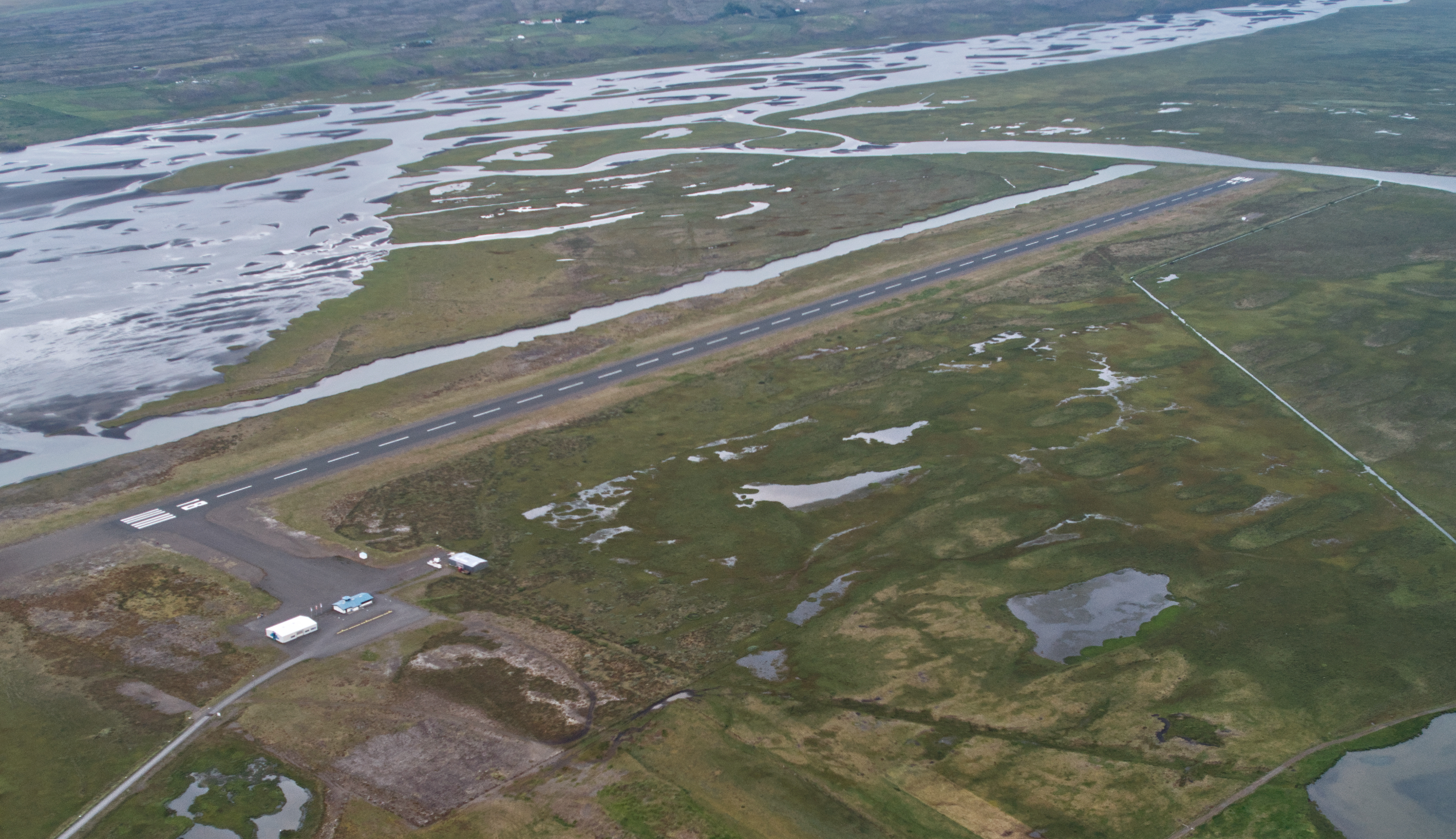
- IATA: SAK; ICAO: BIKR

Summary
- Airport type: Public
- Operator: Isavia
- Serves: Sauðárkrókur, Iceland
- Elevation AMSL: 8 ft / 2 m
- Coordinates: 65°43′54″N 19°34′22″W

Map

Runways
Direction	Length		Surface
Direction	m	ft	Surface
01/19	1,887	6,191	Asphalt
- Source: AIP Iceland GCM Google Maps

Sauðárkrókur Airport (IATA: SAK, ICAO: BIKR) is an airport serving Sauðárkrókur, a village on the Skagafjörður bay in northern Iceland.

The Hegranes non-directional beacon (Ident: HE) is 1.8 nautical miles northeast of the airport.

== Airlines and destinations ==
With Eagle Air ceasing to operate flights to Reykjavík in May 2018, there are no more scheduled flights from Sauðárkrókur.

== Statistics ==
=== Passengers and movements ===
	Number of passengers (Note: Number of passengers including domestic, international and transit.)	Number of movements (Note: Number of movements represents total takeoffs and landings during that year.)
2003	8,392	1,270
2004	6,060	920
2005	5,829	726
2006	5,644	964
2007	6,389	840
2008	7,471	1,066
2009	6,871	892
2010	5,979	862
2011	4,732	684
2012	62	66
2013	1,400	505
2014	42	22
2015	74	54
2016	49	26
2017	164	87
2018	514	194
2019	33	44
2020	15	40
2021	2	50

== See also ==
- Transport in Iceland
- List of airports in Iceland
