= Rif Airport =

Airport in western Iceland

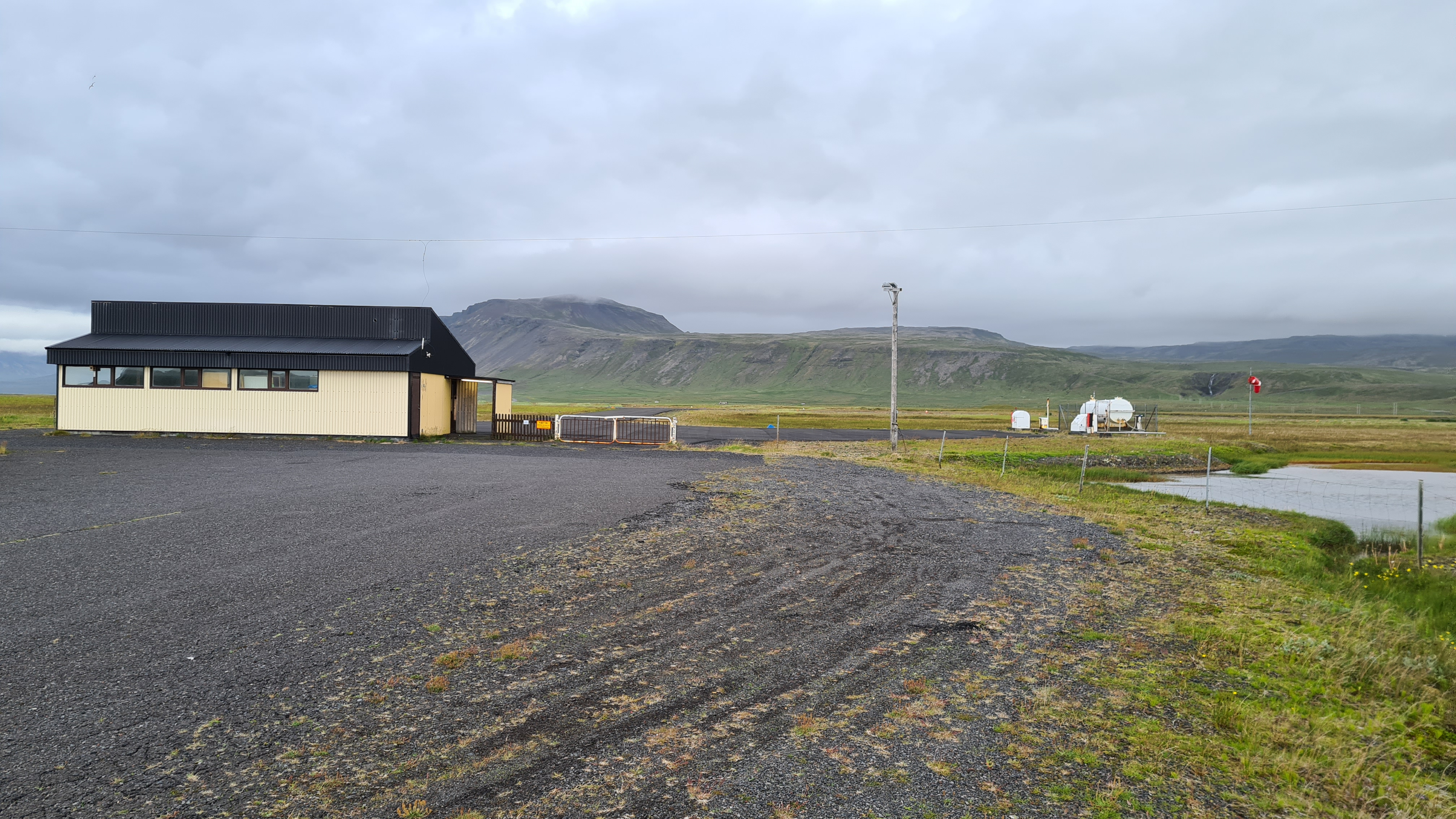
- IATA: OLI; ICAO: BIRF

Summary
- Airport type: Public
- Serves: Ólafsvík, Hellissandur
- Location: Rif
- Elevation AMSL: 18 ft / 5 m
- Coordinates: 64°54′40″N 23°49′00″W

Map
- Location of the airport in Iceland

Runways
Direction	Length		Surface
Direction	m	ft	Surface
06/24	1,200	3,937	Asphalt
12/30	840	2,756	Asphalt
- Source: Google Maps GCM

Rif Airport (IATA: OLI, ICAO: BIRF) is an airport serving Ólafsvík and Hellissandur, Iceland. It is located near Rif, a coastal village in the Western Region.

Rwy 06 length includes a 1,250 feet (381 m) displaced threshold. There is high terrain southeast of the airport.

The Rif non-directional beacon (Ident: RF) is located on the field.

== See also ==
- Transport in Iceland
- List of airports in Iceland
