= Raufarhöfn Airport =

Airport in Raufarhöfn, Iceland

- IATA: RFN; ICAO: BIRG

Summary
- Airport type: Public
- Serves: Raufarhöfn
- Elevation AMSL: 39 ft / 12 m
- Coordinates: 66°24′25″N 15°55′30″W

Map
- Location of the airport in Iceland

Runways
Direction	Length		Surface
Direction	m	ft	Surface
07/25	1,175	3,855	Asphalt
15/33	634	2,080	Asphalt
- Source: Google Maps GCM

Raufarhöfn Airport (IATA: RFN, ICAO: BIRG) is an airport serving Raufarhöfn, Iceland. The runways are 5 kilometres (3.1 mi) south of the town.

The Raufarhöfn non-directional beacon (Ident: RA) is located 2.8 nautical miles north-northwest of the airport.

== See also ==
- Transport in Iceland
- List of airports in Iceland
