= Fagurhólsmýri Airport =

- IATA: FAG; ICAO: BIFM

Summary
- Airport type: Public
- Serves: Fagurhólsmýri
- Elevation AMSL: 56 ft / 17 m
- Coordinates: 63°52′30″N 16°38′30″W

Map
- Location of the airport in Iceland

Runways
Direction	Length		Surface
Direction	m	ft	Surface
09/27	1,200	3,937	Gravel
- Source: Google Maps GCM

Fagurhólsmýri Airport (IATA: FAG, ICAO: BIFM) is an airport serving Fagurhólsmýri, Iceland.

The Ingo VOR-DME (Ident: ING) is located 4.3 nautical miles south of the airport.

== See also ==
- Transport in Iceland
- List of airports in Iceland
