= Hólmavík Airport =

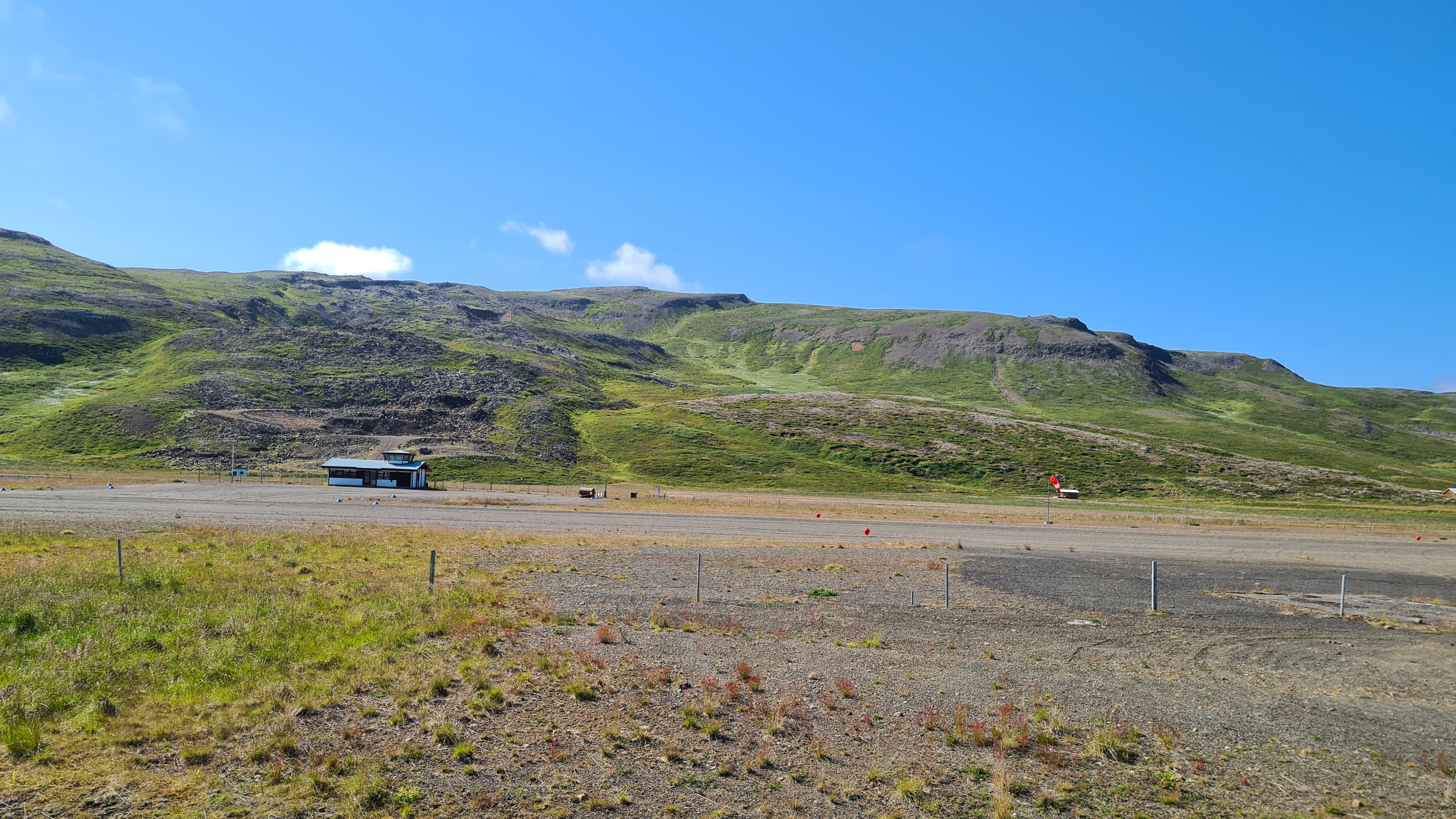
- IATA: HVK; ICAO: BIHK

Summary
- Airport type: Public
- Serves: Hólmavík
- Elevation AMSL: 90 ft / 27 m
- Coordinates: 65°42′10″N 21°41′50″W

Map
- Location of the airport in Iceland

Runways
Direction	Length		Surface
Direction	m	ft	Surface
02/20	1,140	3,740	Gravel
- Source: Google Maps GCM

Hólmavík Airport (IATA: HVK, ICAO: BIHK) is an airport serving Hólmavík, Iceland.

The Holmavik non-directional beacon (Ident: HK) is located 12 kilometres (7.5 mi) southeast of the airport.

== See also ==
- Transport in Iceland
- List of airports in Iceland
