= Þingeyri Airport =

Þingeyri Airport Thingeyri
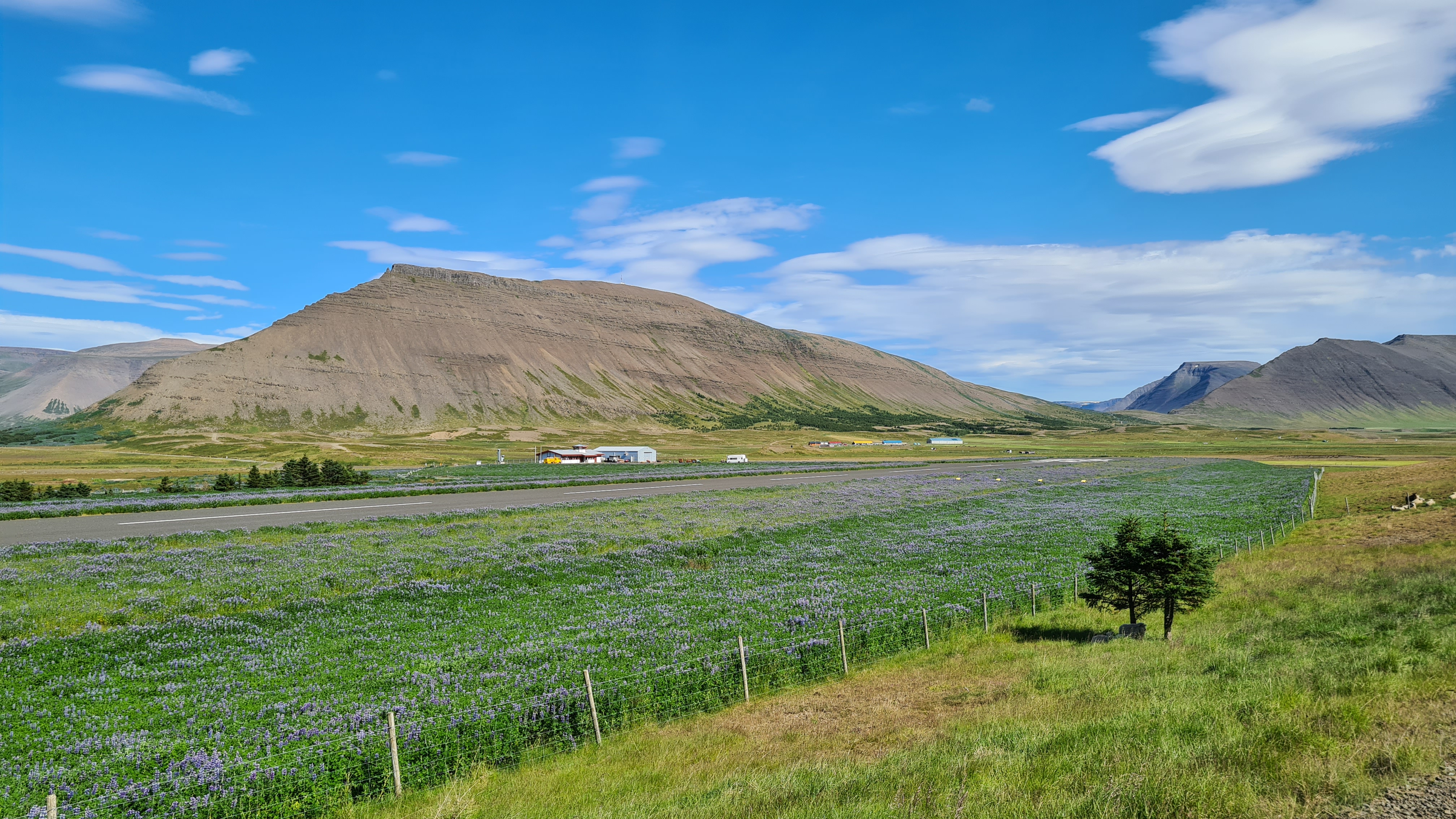
- IATA: TEY; ICAO: BITE

Summary
- Airport type: Public
- Owner/Operator: Isavia
- Serves: Þingeyri
- Elevation AMSL: 65 ft / 20 m
- Coordinates: 65°52′10″N 23°33′30″W

Map
- Location of the airport in Iceland

Runways
Direction	Length		Surface
Direction	m	ft	Surface
14/32	1,210	3,970	Asphalt
- Source: GCM Google Maps

Þingeyri Airport (IATA: TEY, ICAO: BITE) is an airport serving Þingeyri (Thingeyri), Iceland.

It was closed for air traffic in 2013 due to winter damage to the runway. The runway has reopened to traffic. It is typically only used as a backup to Ísafjörður Airport.

== See also ==
- List of airports in Iceland
- Transport in Iceland
