= Hólmavík =

Village in Iceland

- Village
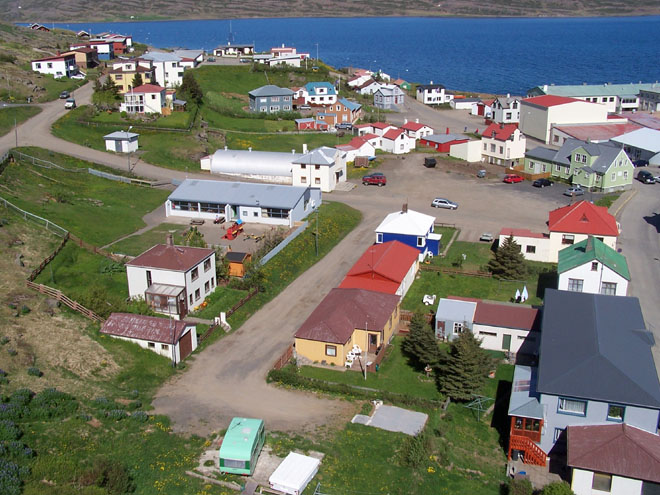
- The village of Hólmavík

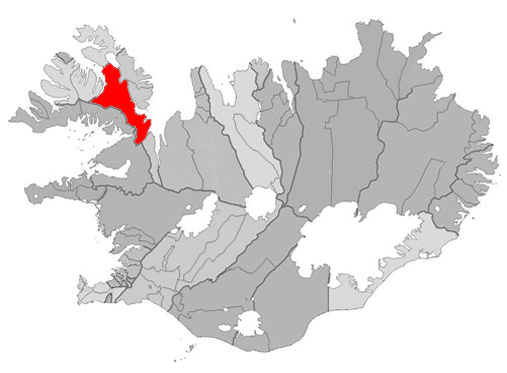
- Location of the Municipality of Strandabyggð

- Location within Iceland
- Coordinates: 65°43′N 21°41′W
- Country: Iceland
- Constituency: Northwest Constituency
- Region: Westfjords
- Municipality: Strandabyggð

Population (January 2011)
  - Total: 375
- Time zone: UTC+0 (GMT)
- Póstnúmer: 510
- Website: Official website

Hólmavík (Icelandic pronunciation: [ˈhoulmaˌviːk]) is a village in the western part of Iceland, by Steingrímsfjörður.

It is the largest settlement in Strandir and serves as a centre of commerce for the county. Hólmavík is part of the Strandabyggð municipality and has 375 inhabitants (2011 census). Hólmavík is home to the Museum of Icelandic Sorcery and Witchcraft and the Holmadrangur shrimp processing plant. The modern church was built in 1968.

Well-known people from Hólmavík include the poet Stefán frá Hvítadal and the musician Gunnar Þórðarson of the band Hljómar. The artist Einar Hákonarson has a studio and a home in Hólmavík.

Hólmavík boasts a swimming pool constructed in 2004. It is the only pool in the region not geothermally heated.

Near Húsavík and Tröllatunga, two farms in the South of Hólmavík, lignite and iron ore were exploited in former times, and some fossils from the Tertiary period were found there as well.

== Transportation ==
Hólmavík is served by Hólmavík Airport. There have not been any scheduled flights to Hólmavík since 1997. Bus schedule is provided by Strætó, Reykjavík City Bus.
