= Patreksfjörður Airport =

Closed airport in Iceland

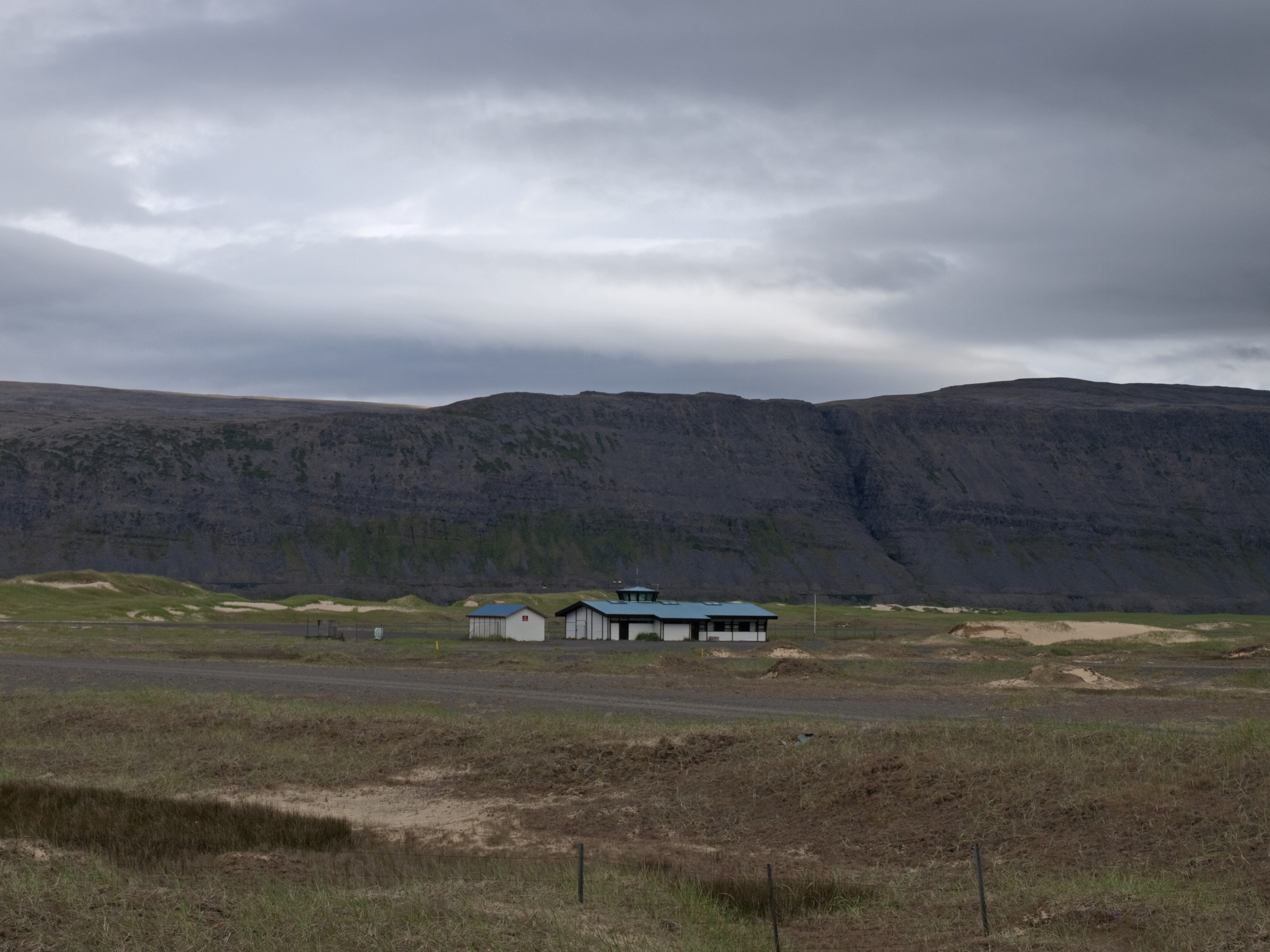
- IATA: PFJ; ICAO: BIPA

Summary
- Airport type: Public
- Operator: Government
- Serves: Patreksfjörður, Iceland
- Closed: 2011
- Passenger services ceased: 2000
- Elevation AMSL: 11 ft / 3 m
- Coordinates: 65°33′25″N 23°58′10″W

Map

Runways
Direction	Length		Surface
Direction	m	ft	Surface
14/32	1,400	4,593	Asphalt
- Source: DAFIF GCM Google Maps

Patreksfjörður Airport or Patreksfjordur Airport (IATA: PFJ, ICAO: BIPA) was an airport serving Patreksfjörður, Iceland. The airport was across the fjord, 4.8 kilometres (3.0 mi) south of the town.

The Patreksfjordur non-directional beacon (Ident: PA) is located on the field.

The airport was closed in 2011 after having had no commercial flight service since 2000.

== See also ==
- Transport in Iceland
- List of airports in Iceland
