= Fagurhólsmýri =

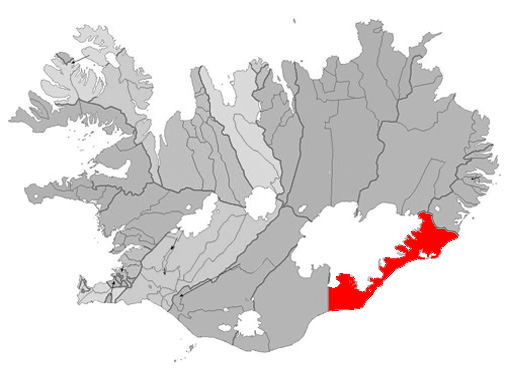
- Location of the Municipality of Sveitarfélagið Hornafjörður

- Location of Fagurhólsmýri in Iceland
- Country: Iceland
- Constituency: South Constituency
- Region: Eastern Region
- Municipality: Sveitarfélagið Hornafjörður
- Time zone: UTC+0 (GMT)

Fagurhólsmýri (Icelandic pronunciation: [ˈfaːɣʏrˌhoulsˌmiːrɪ]; 63.883333°N 16.65°W) is a farm in southern Iceland, located roughly ten kilometres south of the Oraefajokull volcano. The farm has its own airport but there are no regular flights. Local attractions include Ingólshöfdi which is a trail.
