= Kópasker =

Village in Northeastern Region, Iceland

- Village
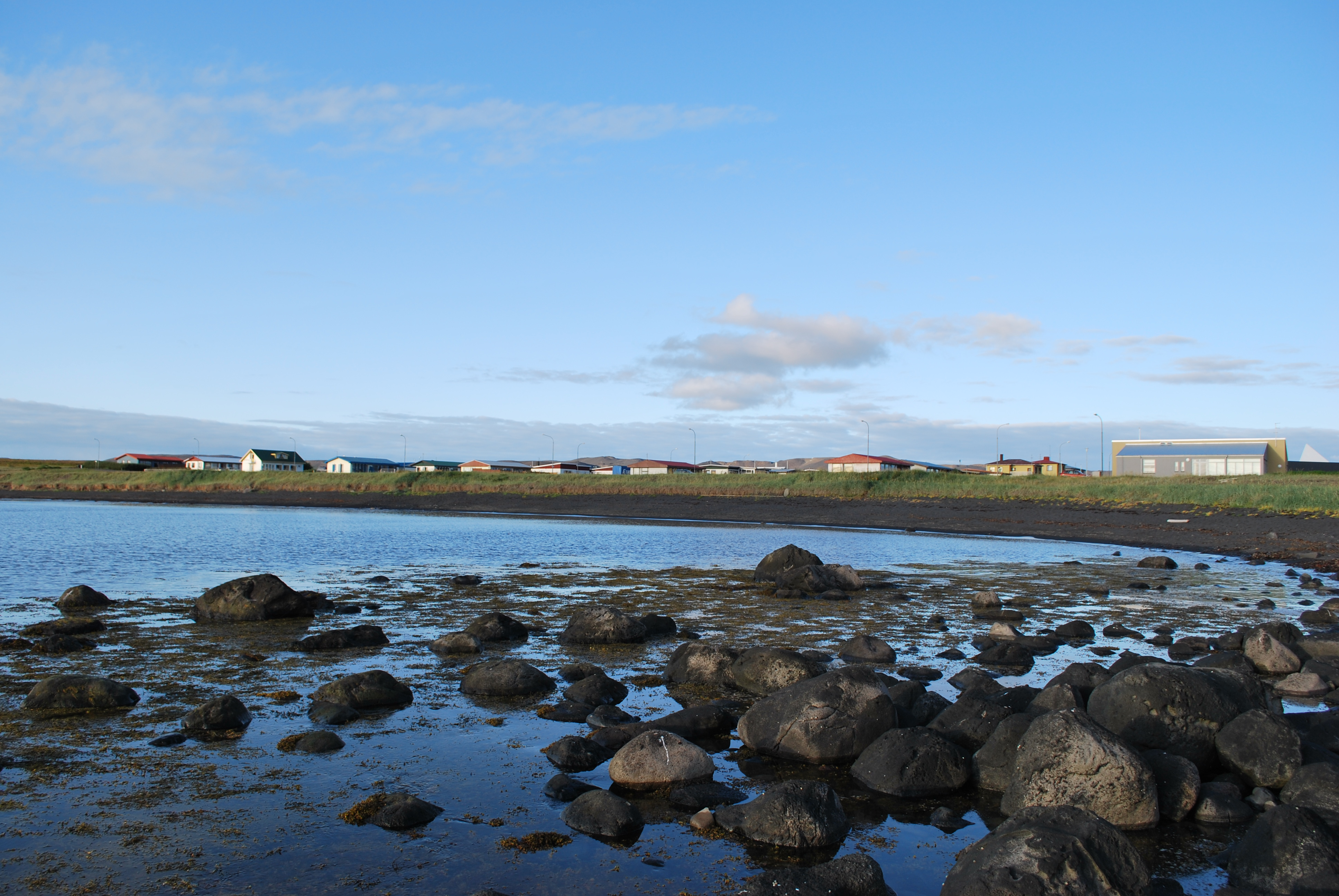

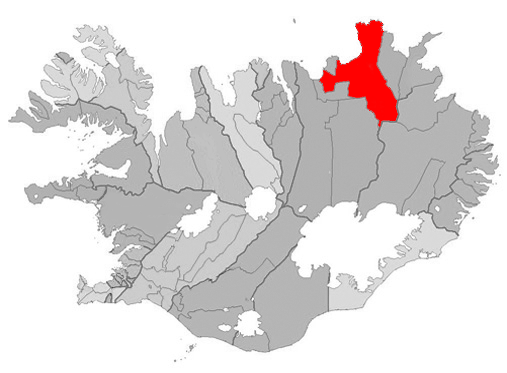
- Location of the Municipality of Norðurþing

- Location in Iceland
- Coordinates: 66°18′N 16°27′W
- Country: Iceland
- Constituency: Northeast Constituency
- Region: Northeastern Region
- Municipality: Norðurþing

Population (2011)
  - Total: 120
- Time zone: UTC+0 (GMT)
- Post Code: 670, 671

Kópasker (Icelandic pronunciation: [ˈkʰouːpaˌscɛːr̥]) is a small village with approximately 120 inhabitants in the municipality of Norðurþing, situated on the eastern shore of Öxarfjörður in northeast Iceland.

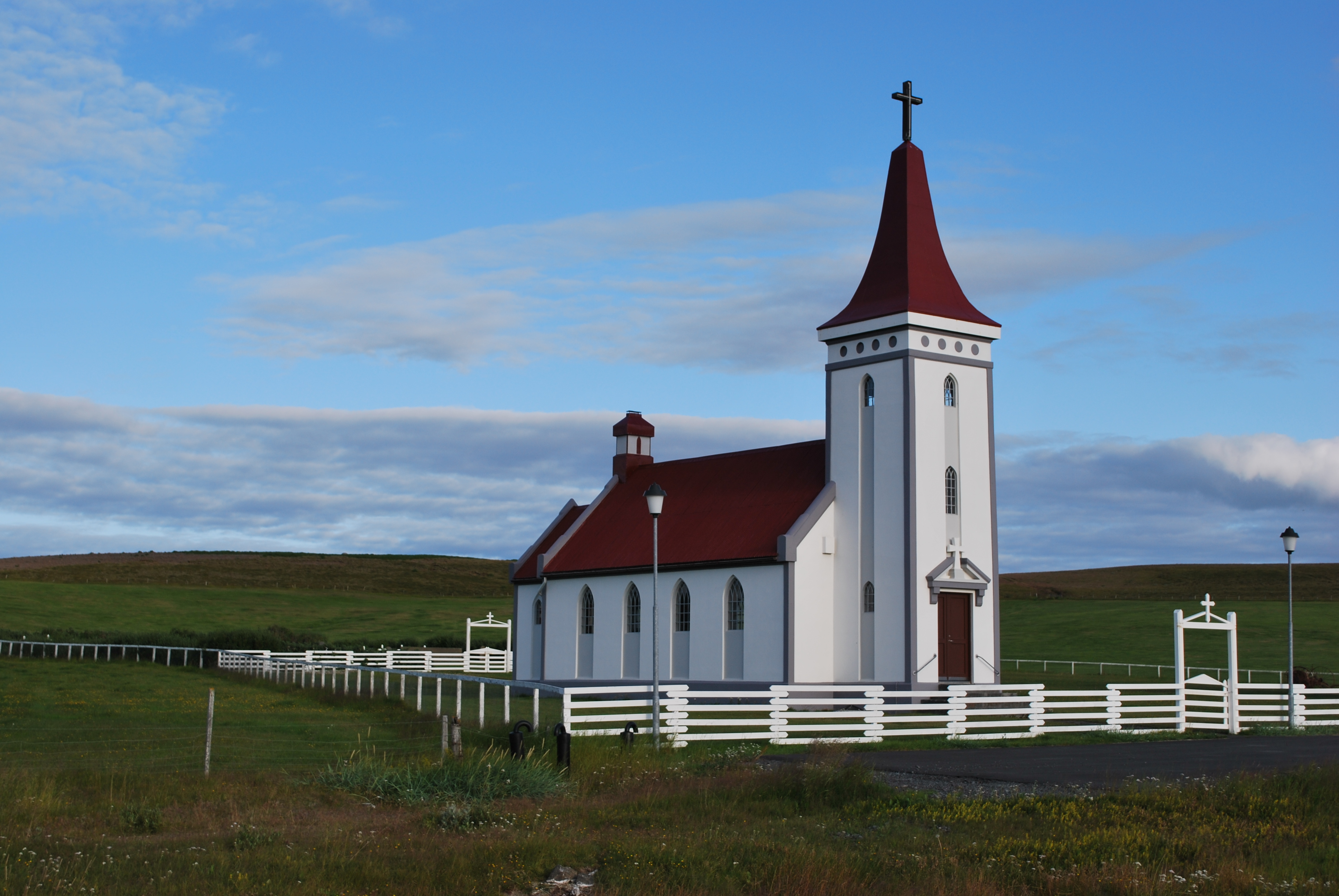
Church of Kópasker: Snartarstaðarkirkja

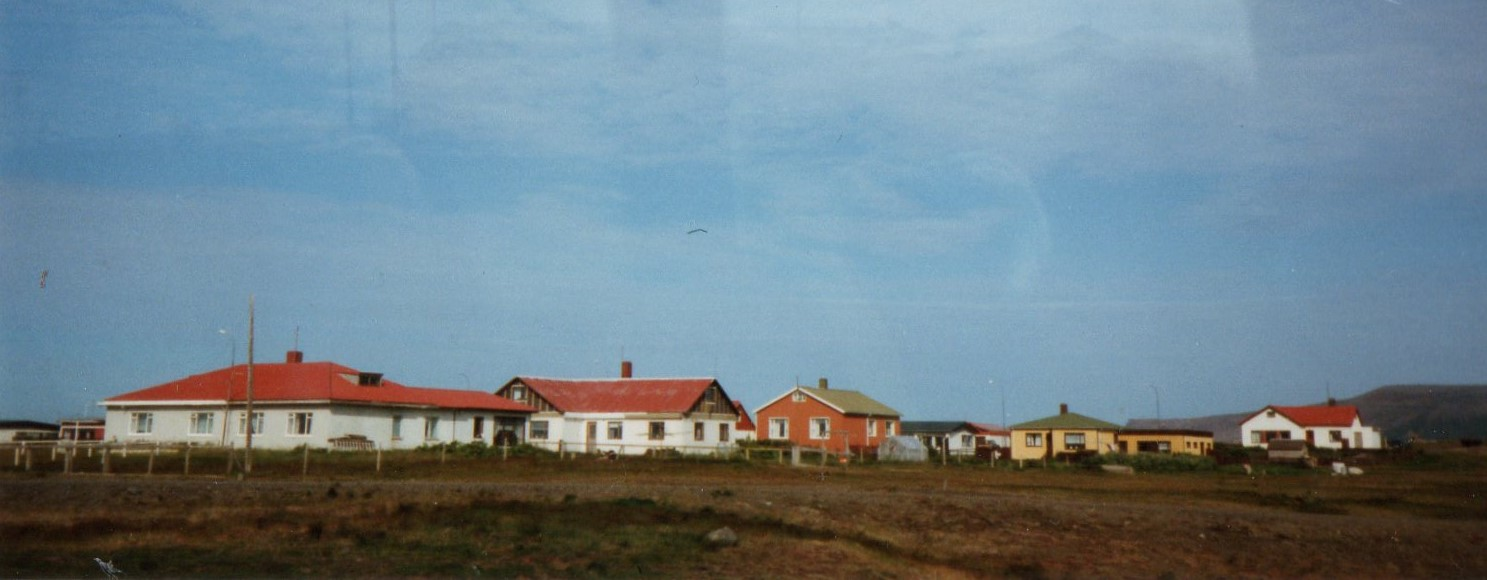
General view

== Overview ==
The first residential house in Kópasker, Bakki, was built in 1912 by Árni Ingimundarson. Bakki burned down in 1988. Kópasker grew around the operation of the Co-op, providing services to local agriculture and fisheries. Meat-processing is the biggest industry in Kópasker, represented by the slaughterhouse and lamb-processing factory, Fjallalamb. The District Museum is located at the church site Snartarstaðir by Kópasker. In the village there is also an exhibition at the Kópasker Earthquake Center describing the big earthquake of 1976 that measured 6.3 on the Richter scale and destroyed several houses and other structures in the area. Snartarstaðarkirkja is a Protestant stone church which seats about 90 persons. It was inaugurated on 5 March 1929 after the old church of Kópasker had been torn down. The church remained undamaged by the earthquake of 1976. The cross at the top of the tower was added in 1979 on the occasion of the 50th jubilee of the inauguration.

In Kópasker there is a shop, garage, health care centre, school, bank, campsite and guesthouses. North of Kópasker is the peninsula Melrakkaslétta, with its abundant birdlife, and also the northernmost point of mainland Iceland, Hraunhafnartangi.

The village has its own airport, Kópasker Airport, located approximately a kilometre north of the town.
