= Transport in Iceland =

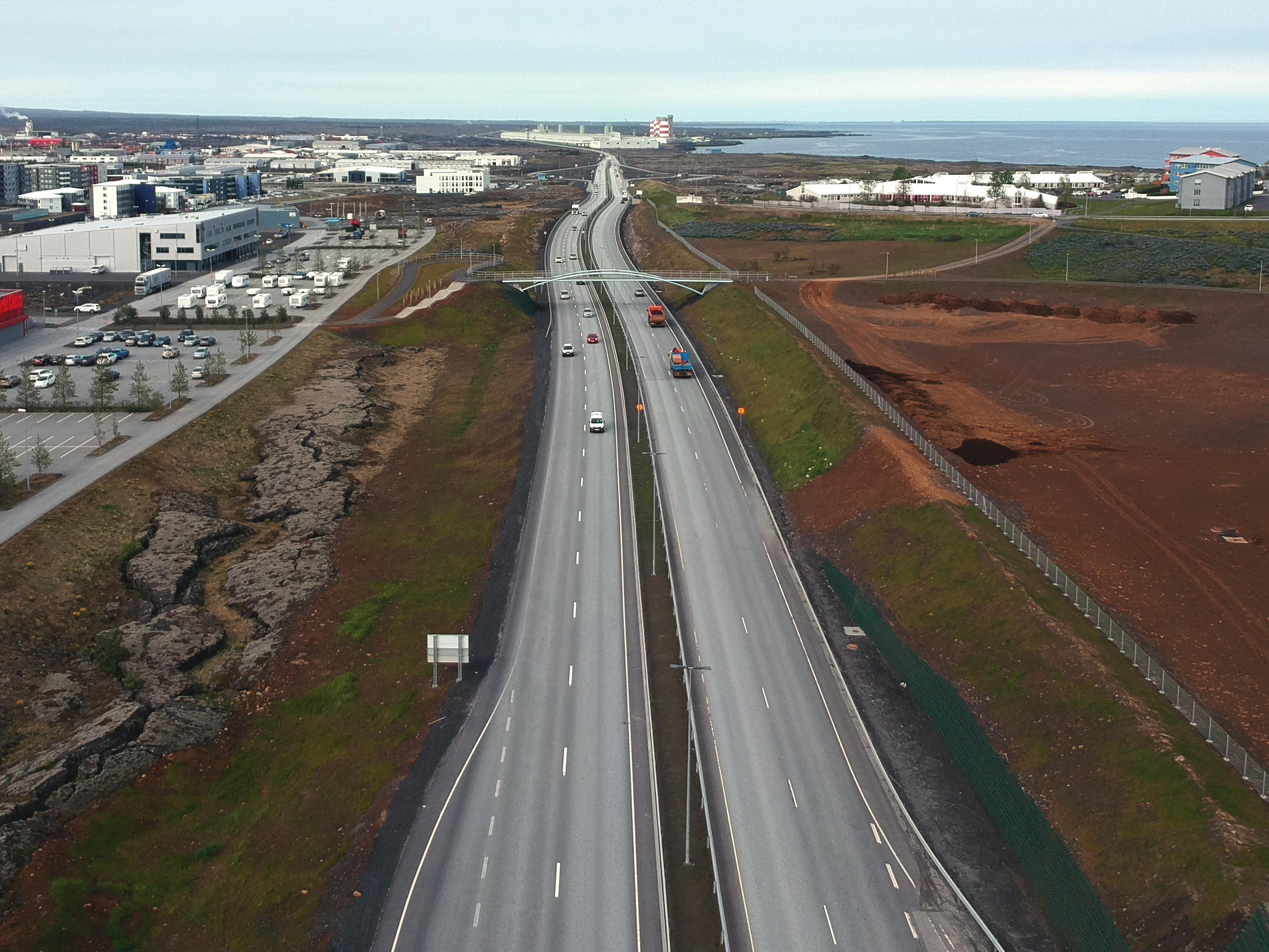
Road transport is the primary domestic mode of transport in iceland. Pictured is Reykjanesbraut (Route 41)

The modes of transport in Iceland are governed by the country's rugged terrain and sparse population. Domestically, the principal mode of transportation is by road, supplemented by air transport for longer distances. International transport is mostly by sea for freight and by air for passenger services, post and perishable goods. There are no railways, although there are passenger bus services.

The Icelandic Transport Authority regulates all modes of transport in Iceland. Most of the country's transport infrastructure is concentrated near the Greater Reykjavík Area, which is home to 64% of the country's population.

== Rail ==
Iceland has no railways, although proposals to build a passenger line between Keflavík and Reykjavík have been made as well as proposals to build a light rail system in Reykjavík.

In the past, two locomotive-powered railways were used during certain construction projects as well as cable and manually hauled railways have been used, but these have long since been dismantled.

== Road ==
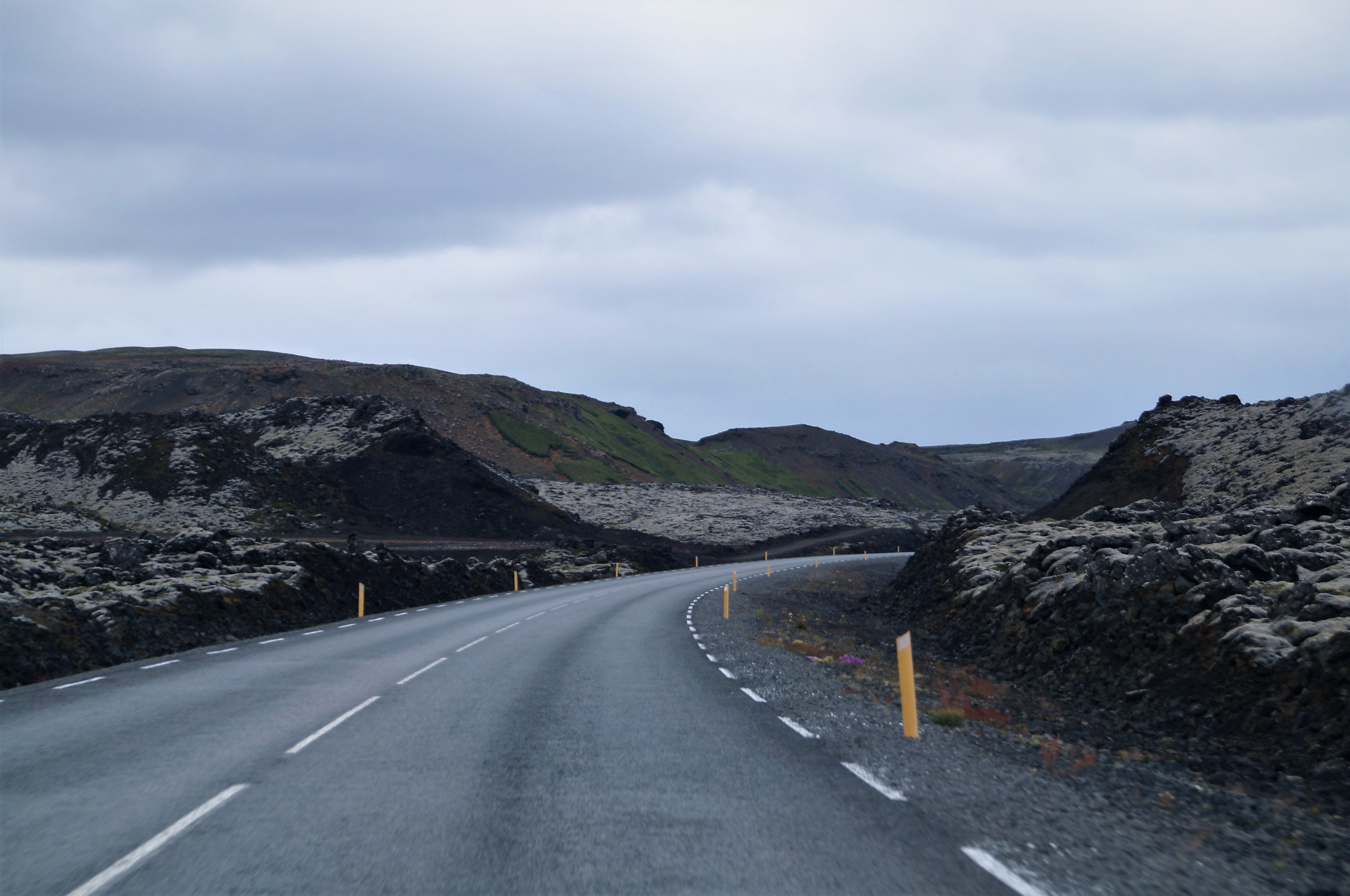
Typical stretch of road in Iceland

Transport in Iceland is heavily dependent on roads and most domestic freight and passenger transport is carried by road. As of 2025, Iceland has 12,900 kilometres (8,000 mi) of public highways, 7,300 kilometres (4,500 mi) of which are paved. Most highways are two-lane roads, but in the southwestern corner of the country dual carriageways are prevalent, including in and around Reykjavík. Roads to remote areas, including the highlands are usually unpaved. Iceland has 14 road tunnels, including one undersea tunnel, totalling around 60 km.

Iceland drives on the right. The national speed limit is 90 kilometres per hour (56 mph) ; 70 kilometres per hour (43 mph) in tunnels and 50 kilometres per hour (31 mph) through urban areas. Road signs in Iceland are based on the Vienna Convention on Road Signs and Signals but it is not a signatory. Iceland is a party to the 1949 Geneva Convention on Road Traffic.

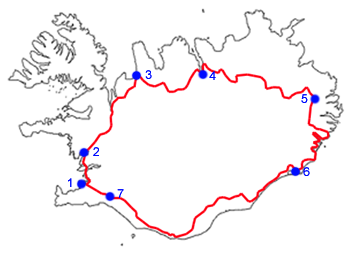
The Ring Road of Iceland

The Ring Road of Iceland (Route 1) circles the entire country. It is a major trunk route and is considered to be the most important piece of transport infrastructure in Iceland as it connects the majority of towns together in the most densely populated areas of the country. Economically, it carries a large proportion of goods traffic as well as tourist traffic. The total length of the road is 1,322 kilometres (821 mi), making it the longest ring road in Europe. Most other routes branch off the ring road.

Vegagerðin, the Icelandic Road Administration, manages the country's road network. 11.4% of passenger-kilometres are by bus and 88.6% by car, as of 2018. Iceland has one of the highest rates of car ownership in the world—with 779 cars per 1000 people as of 2024.

=== Cycling ===
Dedicated cycling infrastructure exists within the Greater Reykjavík Area and other towns. Cycling on national highways is permitted, but discouraged due to unsafe conditions on high traffic two-lane roads. Dedicated cycle paths exist between Keflavík Airport and the town of Keflavík, as well as between Selfoss and Eyrarbakki.

== Sea ==
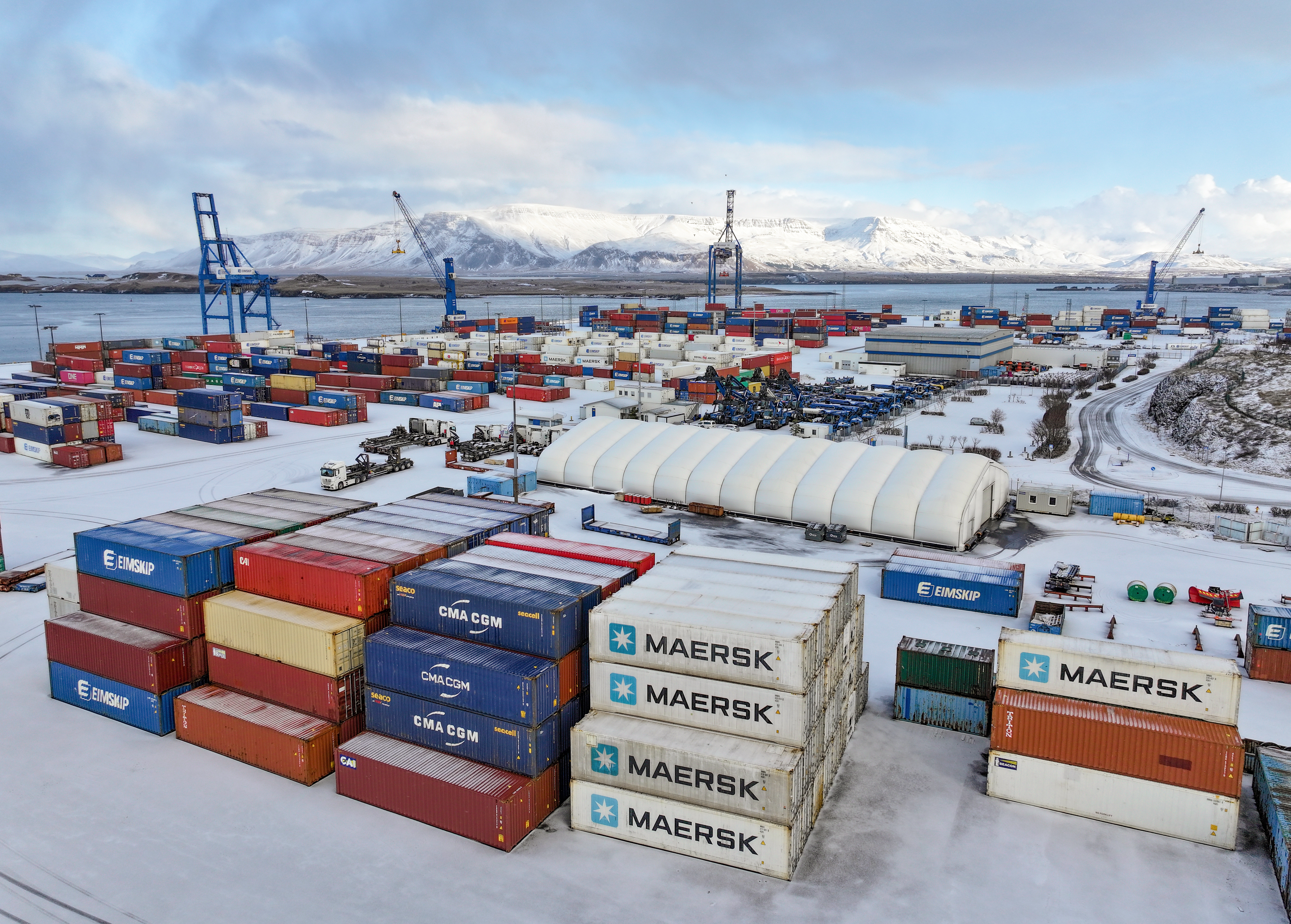
Sundahöfn Port in Reykjavík

As an island country, Iceland has always been reliant on the sea for transportation. Most towns in Iceland are located on the coast for this reason, as shipping was the only viable option and for access to fishing grounds. Domestic freight shipping went into decline with the development of the road network in the late 20th century. All ports in Iceland are ice-free year round. In the early 21st century, there was a significant increase in cruise ship traffic to, from and around Iceland.

=== Major shipping ports ===
- Akureyri
- Grundartangi - heavy industry
- Húsavík
- Ísafjörður
- Keflavík - fuel
- Reykjavík (Sundahöfn) - largest port in Iceland
- Reykjavík (Örfirisey) - fuel
- Reyðarfjörður - aluminium smelter
- Sauðarkrókur
- Seyðisfjörður - international ferry port
- Straumsvík - aluminium smelter
- Vestmannaeyjar

=== Merchant marine ===
Eimskip and Samskip are the major shipping companies of Iceland providing container routes to Europe and North America. Other shipping companies also provide service.

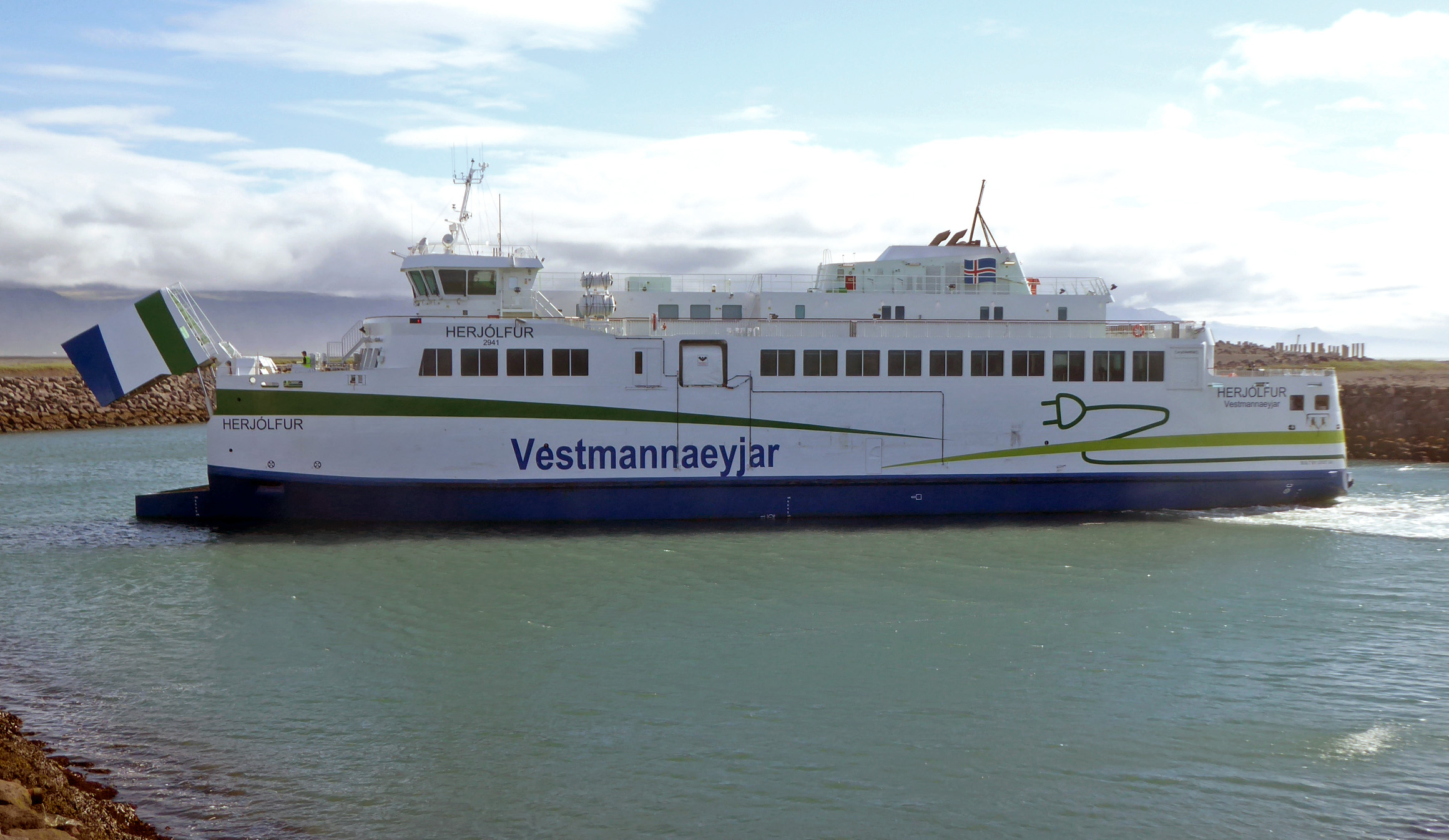
The Herjólfur ferry sails to Vestmannaeyjar.

=== Transport ferries ===
The only habitable islands around Iceland are connected with the mainland by regular ferries:

- Landeyjarhöfn-Vestmannaeyjar The largest and most populated offshore island, located off the south coast. Sails to Þorlákshöfn in bad sea conditions. Roll-on/roll-off ferry
- Dalvík/Árskógssandur-Hrísey in the middle of Eyjafjörður fjord in northern Iceland.
- Dalvík-Grímsey in the far north, the northernmost part of Iceland.
- Stykkisholmur-Flatey-Brjánslækur in the Breiðafjörður bay. Roll-on/roll-off ferry

There is one international roll-on/roll-off ferry, Norröna, between Seyðisfjörður on the east coast of Iceland to Hirtshals, Denmark via Tórshavn, Faroe Islands. It is run by Smyril Line.

== Air ==
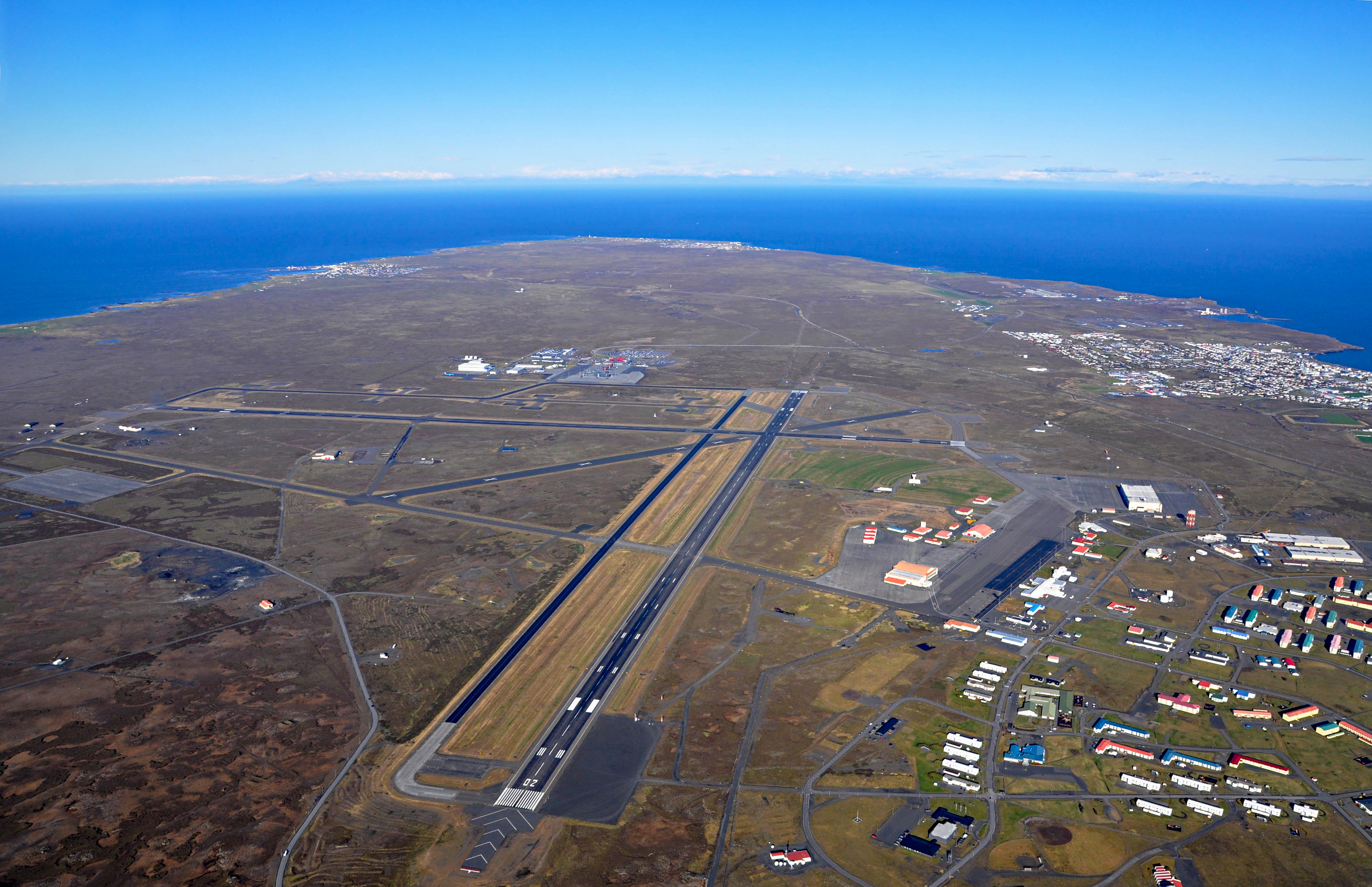
Keflavík International Airport

As of 2024, there are 83 airports in Iceland, of which 12 are served by regular scheduled passenger air service. Keflavík International Airport is by far largest airport and is the country's international transport hub; almost all journeys to and from Iceland pass through this airport. Akureyri Airport is also served by scheduled international services. Reykjavík Airport, located within the city, is the country's domestic hub.

The largest airline is Icelandair, which provides both international and domestic connectivity. Norlandair provides air service to more remote domestic destinations. Iceland is unusually well connected, considering its population, with over 80 destinations served primarily to North America and Europe, as a result of its tourism industry and role as a transatlantic bridge.

Airport runways in Iceland
Length	Paved	Unpaved	Totals
Over 3,047 m	1	0	1
1,524 to 2,437 m	3	3	6
914 to 1,523 m	2	27	29
Under 914 m	0	63	63
Total	6	93	99

== Public transport ==
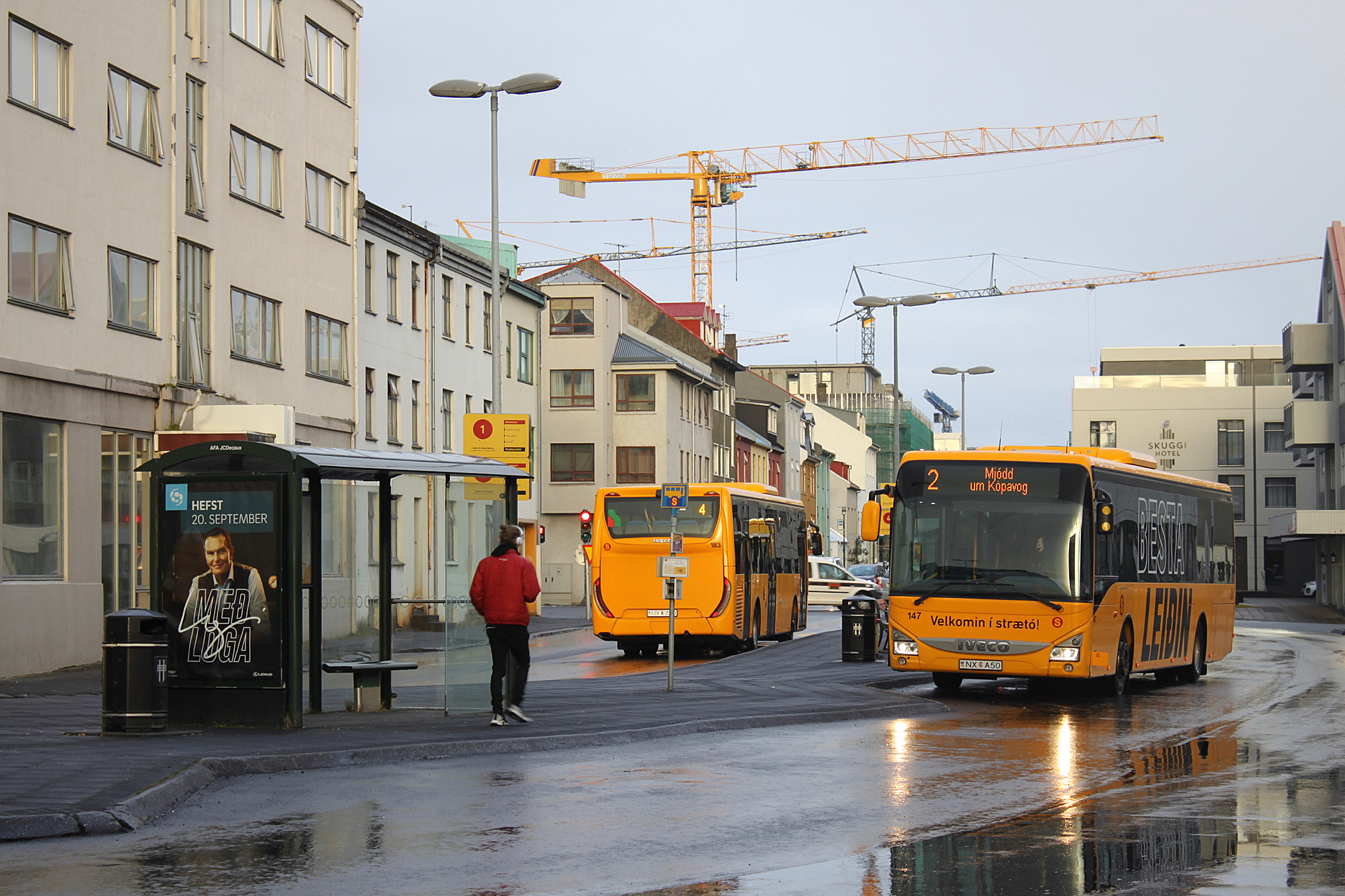
Strætó buses in Reykjavík.

Public transport in Iceland is based entirely on buses, as no railways or rapid transit systems exist. The largest bus system is in the Greater Reykjavík Area, operated by Strætó. Urban bus systems also operate in the towns of Akureyri, Akranes, Egilsstaðir and Reykjanesbær (Keflavík). Strætó also manages long-distance buses around the country which are operated from the Mjódd terminal in Reykjavík. Most towns in Iceland are served by long-distance bus services and regional systems also operate in Árborg (Selfoss), the Westfjords and in North and East Iceland. Long-distance services are infrequent and mainly targeted towards schoolchildren, although some trunk routes are better served. All ferries, as described in the previous section, carry passengers. Many in Iceland consider domestic air travel a form of public transport.

Automobile ownership in Iceland is high—the country has one of the highest rates in the world—with 779 cars per 1000 people (as of 2024), a figure similar to the United States. Throughout the latter half of the 20th century, government policy and investment was based on road transport, including in Reykjavík. As a result, Iceland is highly car-dependent and public transport systems in Iceland are relatively underdeveloped. Long-distance travel between towns in Iceland was previously dependent on air travel, due to terrain and underdeveloped road networks, as such long-distance buses never became very prevalent.

=== Borgarlína ===
A bus rapid transit system is planned for the Greater Reykjavík Area, called Borgarlína. Originally envisioned as a light rail system, the network will be composed of dedicated rights of way for buses and prioritised junctions. As of 2025, the first phase is due to open in 2031.

== See also ==
- H-dagurinn
- Rail transport in Iceland
- Road signs in Iceland
- Tunnels in Iceland
- Vegagerðin
