= Bíldudalur Airport =

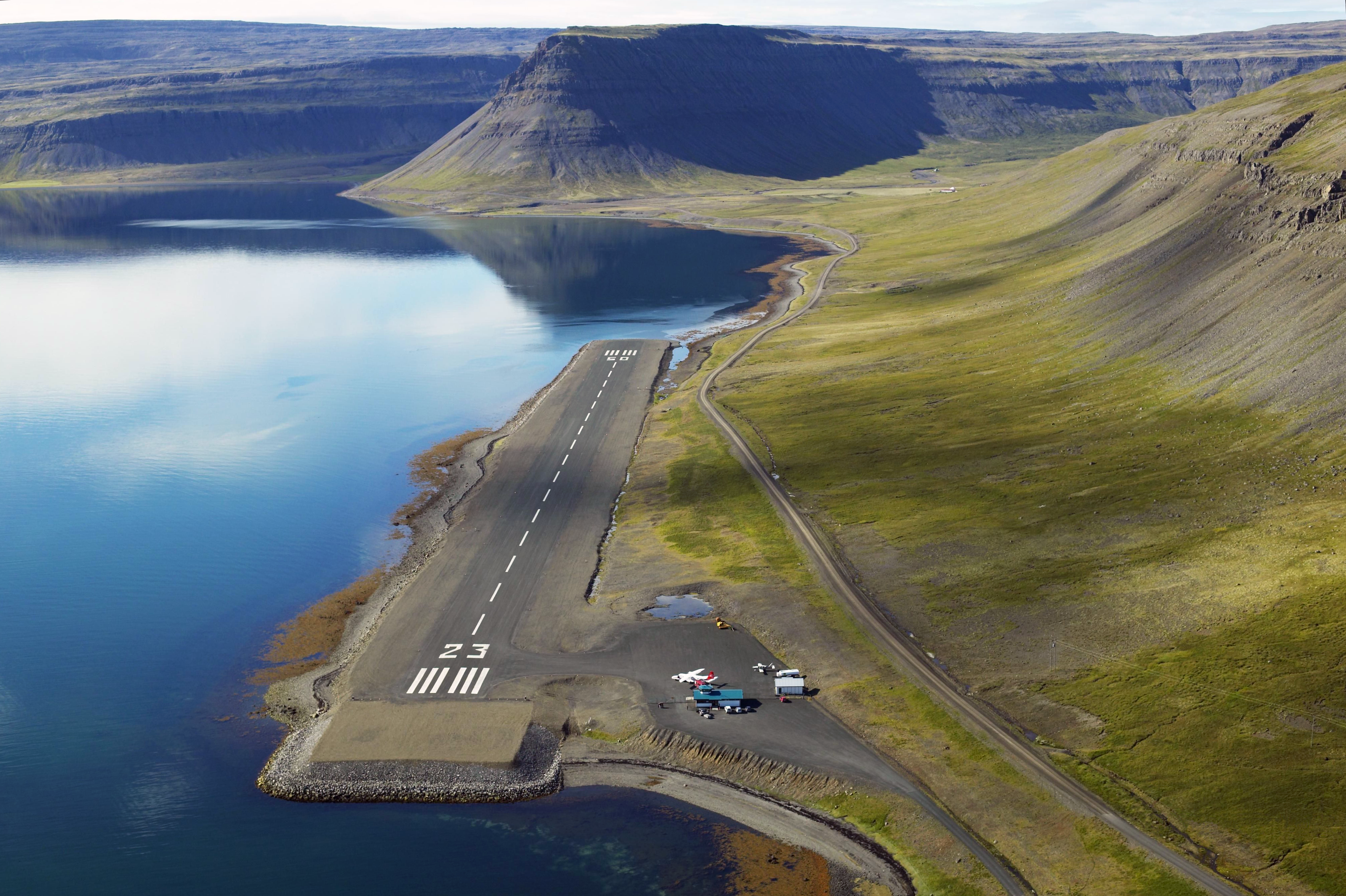
- IATA: BIU; ICAO: BIBD

Summary
- Airport type: Public
- Operator: ISAVIA
- Serves: Bíldudalur, Tálknafjörður and Patreksfjörður, Iceland
- Elevation AMSL: 26 ft / 8 m
- Coordinates: 65°38′30″N 23°32′45″W

Map

Runways
Direction	Length		Surface
Direction	m	ft	Surface
05/23	1,000	3,281	Asphalt
- Source: AIP Iceland GCM Google Maps

Bíldudalur Airport (IATA: BIU, ICAO: BIBD) is an airport serving Bíldudalur, a village in the Vesturbyggð municipality in the Westfjords of Iceland. The runway is 5 kilometres (3.1 mi) south-southeast of the village.

Flights that land in Northern direction, which is common, have to pass a 450 metres (1,480 ft) mountain pass as well as an altitude margin only 9 kilometres (5.6 mi) from the runway. These flights also have to make a fairly steep descent and perform a 40-degree turn just before landing.

== Airlines and destinations ==
Airlines	Destinations
Norlandair	Reykjavík

== Statistics ==
=== Passengers and movements ===
	Number of passengers (Note: Number of passengers including domestic, international and transit.)	Number of movements (Note: Number of movements represents total takeoffs and landings during that year.)
2003	4,148	732
2004	4,326	780
2005	3,858	826
2006	3,418	740
2007	2,866	930
2008	3,926	838
2009	3,764	758
2010	3,602	716
2011	3,513	694
2012	4,180	686
2013	3,921	692
2014	3,575	664
2015	3,371	652
2016	3,333	734
2017	3,600	742
2018	3,014	725
2019	2,983	696
2020	2,304	604
2021	3,685	777

== See also ==
- Transport in Iceland
- List of airports in Iceland
