= Futuregrapher =

Icelandic electronic musician (1983–2025)

Árni Grétar Jóhannesson
- Also known as: Futuregrapher
- Born: 6 December 1983; Patreksfjörður, Iceland
- Origin: Tálknafjörður, Iceland
- Died: 4 January 2025 (aged 41) Reykjavík, Iceland
- Genres: Electronic
- Occupations: Musician; producer
- Formerly of: Royal
- Website: Facebook site

Árni Grétar Jóhannesson (6 December 1983 – 4 January 2025), known professionally as Futuregrapher, was an Icelandic electronic musician and one of the founders of the record company Möller Records.

On 31 December 2024, Árni's car crashed into Reykjavík Harbour. He was retrieved from the car by fire department divers in a critical condition, and was then transported to the National University Hospital of Iceland, where he died on 4 January 2025, at the age of 41.

== Discography ==
- LP (2012)
- Skynvera (2014)
- Eitt (2015)
- Hrafnagil (2016)
