= Reykhólahreppur =

- Municipality
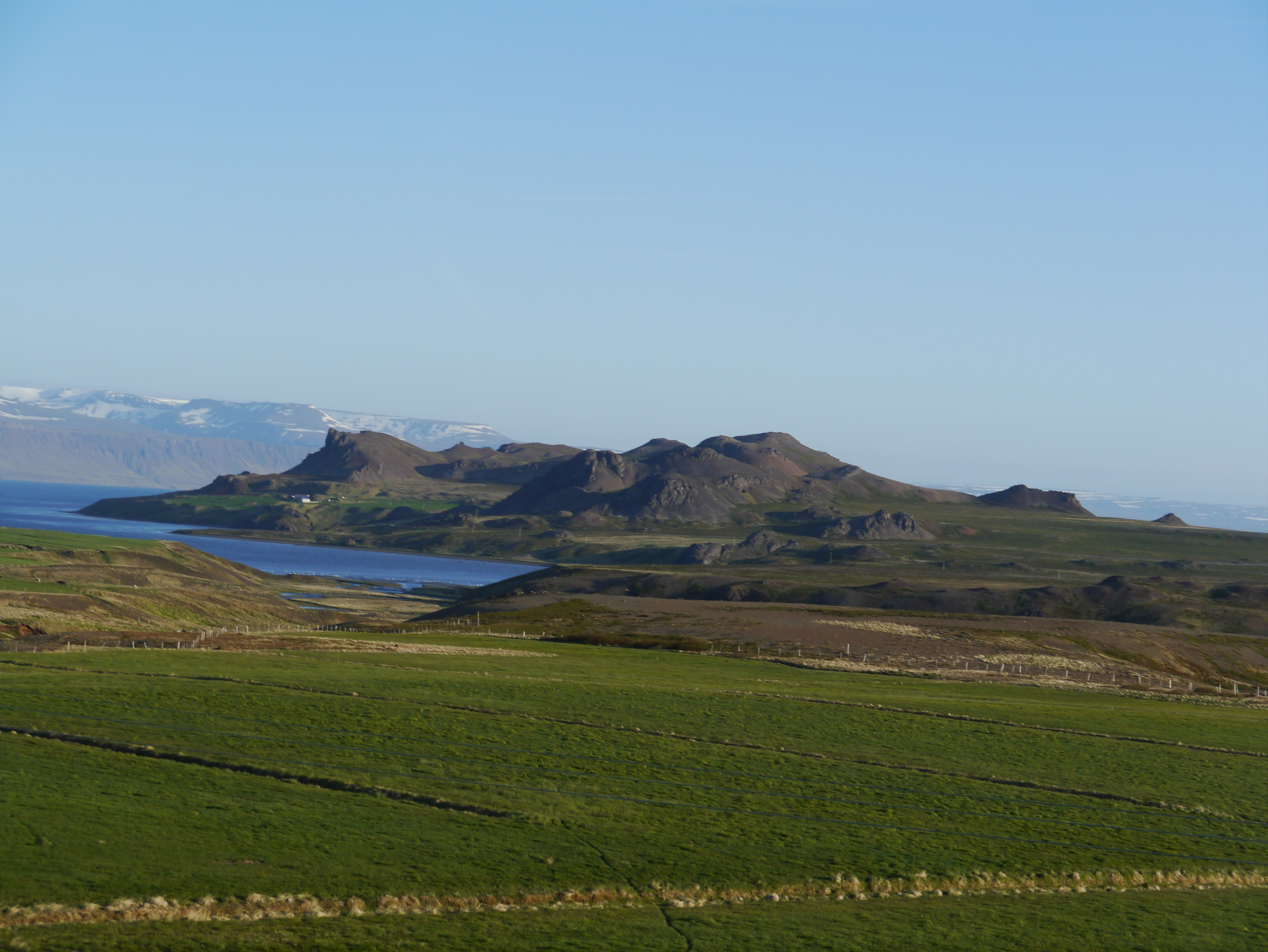
- Skyline of Reykhólahreppur

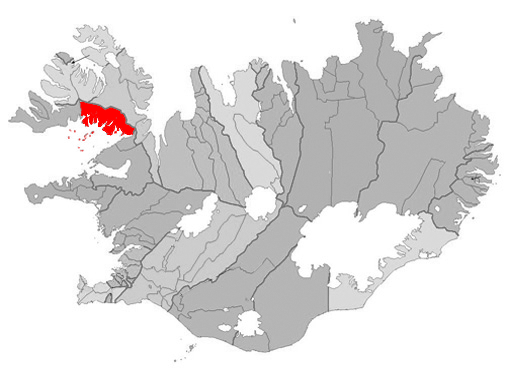
- Location of Reykhólahreppur

- Location within Iceland
- Coordinates: 65°26′46″N 22°12′29″W
- Country: Iceland
- Region: Westfjords
- Constituency: Northwest Constituency

Government
  - Manager: Kjartan Þór Ragnarsson

Area
  - Total: 1,090 km^{2} (420 sq mi)

Population
  - Total: 271
  - Density: 0.25/km^{2} (0.65/sq mi)
- Postal code(s): 380
- Municipal number: 4502
- Website: reykholar.is

Reykhólahreppur (Icelandic pronunciation: [ˈreikˌhouːlaˌr̥ɛhpʏr̥]) is a municipality in the Westfjords, Iceland. Its major settlement is Reykhólar.
