= Kaldrananeshreppur =

Coordinates: 65°41′25″N 21°26′30″W

- Municipality
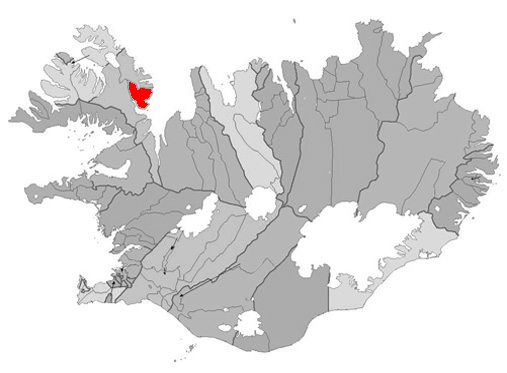
- Location of the municipality

- Location within Iceland
- Country: Iceland
- Region: Westfjords
- Constituency: Northwest Constituency

Area
  - Total: 387 km^{2} (149 sq mi)

Population
  - Total: 105
  - Density: 0.27/km^{2} (0.70/sq mi)
- Postal code(s): 520
- Municipal number: 4902
- Website: drangsnes.is

Kaldrananeshreppur (Icelandic pronunciation: [ˈkʰaltˌraːnaˌnɛsˌr̥ɛhpʏr̥]) is a sparsely-populated municipality in northwest Iceland. According to the 2009 census, it had a population of 112 inhabitants.

In March 2026, residents voted to unify with Árneshreppur, but the referendum was declared invalid in May.

== Places in Kaldrananeshreppur ==
- Goðafoss (Bjarnarfjörður)
- Kaldrananeskirkja
- Hveravík
- Drangsnes
