= Rauðasandshreppur =

Coordinates: 65.517°N 24.053°W

Rauðasandshreppur (Icelandic pronunciation: [ˈrœyːðaˌsan(t)sˌr̥ɛhpʏr̥]) was the most western hreppur of Vestur-Barðastrandarsýsla.

In 1907 the hreppur was divided in two, with the northern part becoming Patrekshreppur. On 11 June 1994 these two hreppar were recombined, along with Bíldudalshreppur and Barðastrandarhreppur under the name Vesturbyggð.
