= 2023 Tálknafjarðarhreppur–Vesturbyggð municipal merger referendum =

Referendum on the unification of two Icelandic municipalities

- October 28, 2023

Results
Choice	Votes	%
Yes	503	85.84%
No	78	13.31%
Blank votes	5	0.85%
Valid votes	586	99.83%
Invalid votes	1	0.17%
Total votes	587	100.00%

The Tálknafjarðarhreppur–Vesturbyggð municipal merger referendum was a proposed unification of the Icelandic municipalities of Tálknafjarðarhreppur and Vesturbyggð. The final day to vote was October 28, 2023, and the measure succeeded, with over 85% of the vote being in favor.

== Background ==
During the summer of 2022, the two municipalities' local councils began an informal conversation on the matter. In early 2023, the joint task force proposed to the two local governments that formal merger negotiations should begin.

The goals of the merger were to strengthen administration, improve services, and further their ability to achieve results in regional development, economic growth, and transportation infrastructure.

In the referendum, 16 and 17 year olds, along with those who were older than that, were allowed to vote. The merger required a majority of votes cast in each municipality to be in favor in order for the measure to succeed.

== Viewpoints ==
Vesturbyggð mayor Vesturbyggð Þórdís Sif Sigurðardóttir: "This will be discussed by both local administrations next week. And I think it is very likely, based on the composition of the project board and the tone of the conversations so far, that the proposal will be accepted by both municipalities. My feeling is that there is a better chance now than before that there will be a positive outcome."

Tálknafjörður mayor Ólafur Þór Ólafsson: "From what I hear, there is more desire than not for a merger. It’s greatly in the interests for this part of the Westfjords as they develop in the future. These are two municipalities in an area with very similar interests. There is already a lot of cooperation, of the kind that means this would be a much easier merger than perhaps elsewhere."

== Results ==
Voting took place from October 9 until October 28, 2023.

In Tálknafjarðarhreppur, 139 people voted yes, 5 voted no, and 1 individual's ballot was blank. In Vesturbyggð, there were 364 votes in favor, 73 opposed, 4 blank ballots, and 1 invalid ballot. Of the 201 people on the electoral roll in Tálknafjarðarhreppur, 145 votes were cast, and in Vesturbyggð, of the 804 registered voters, 442 votes were cast.

== See also ==
- Iceland
- Elections in Iceland
