= Patreksfjörður farmed salmon escape =

Environmental disaster

The Patreksfjörður farmed salmon escape involved the escape of approximately 3500 farm-raised Atlantic salmon from an open fish farm into the open fjord on August 20, 2023, at Patreksfjörður, a village on the northwest coast of Iceland. The fish farm is managed by Arctic Fish, an agricultural company in Norway. Soon after the incident, Arctic Fish discovered two 20 by 30-centimeter holes in its net pens.

== Incident ==
Arctic Fish fixed the two holes by placing new nets over them on August 21, 2023. Drone footage shows that fish were seen in the river of Ósá in Patreksfjörður on August 22, 2023. Inspectors from the Directorate of Fisheries, Norway, ordered Arctic Fish to set up nets in nearby rivers on August 23, 2023. At least four salmon that appeared to have characteristics of farmed salmon were caught in the nets and were sent to the Marine and Freshwater Research Institute for analysis. Arctic Fish has issued an apology.

Many of the escaped farmed salmon have reached sexual maturity. This implies that there will most likely be introgression between the escapees and the local wild salmon population. Farmed salmon escape incidents can cause irreversible and substantial impacts on wild salmon populations.

== Aftermath ==
Since this incident, there has also been a sea lice outbreak at an open sea salmon farm in Tálknafjörður, Iceland. Many locals and environmentalists protested against open sea fish farm industries in Iceland.

On November 9, 2023, Icelandic singer-songwriter, Björk, released a song titled, "Oral," in collaboration with Catalan pop star, Rosalía. The profits from the song will go towards supporting activists fighting for new laws and regulations for aquaculture in Iceland.
