= Tálknafjarðarhreppur =

- Former municipality
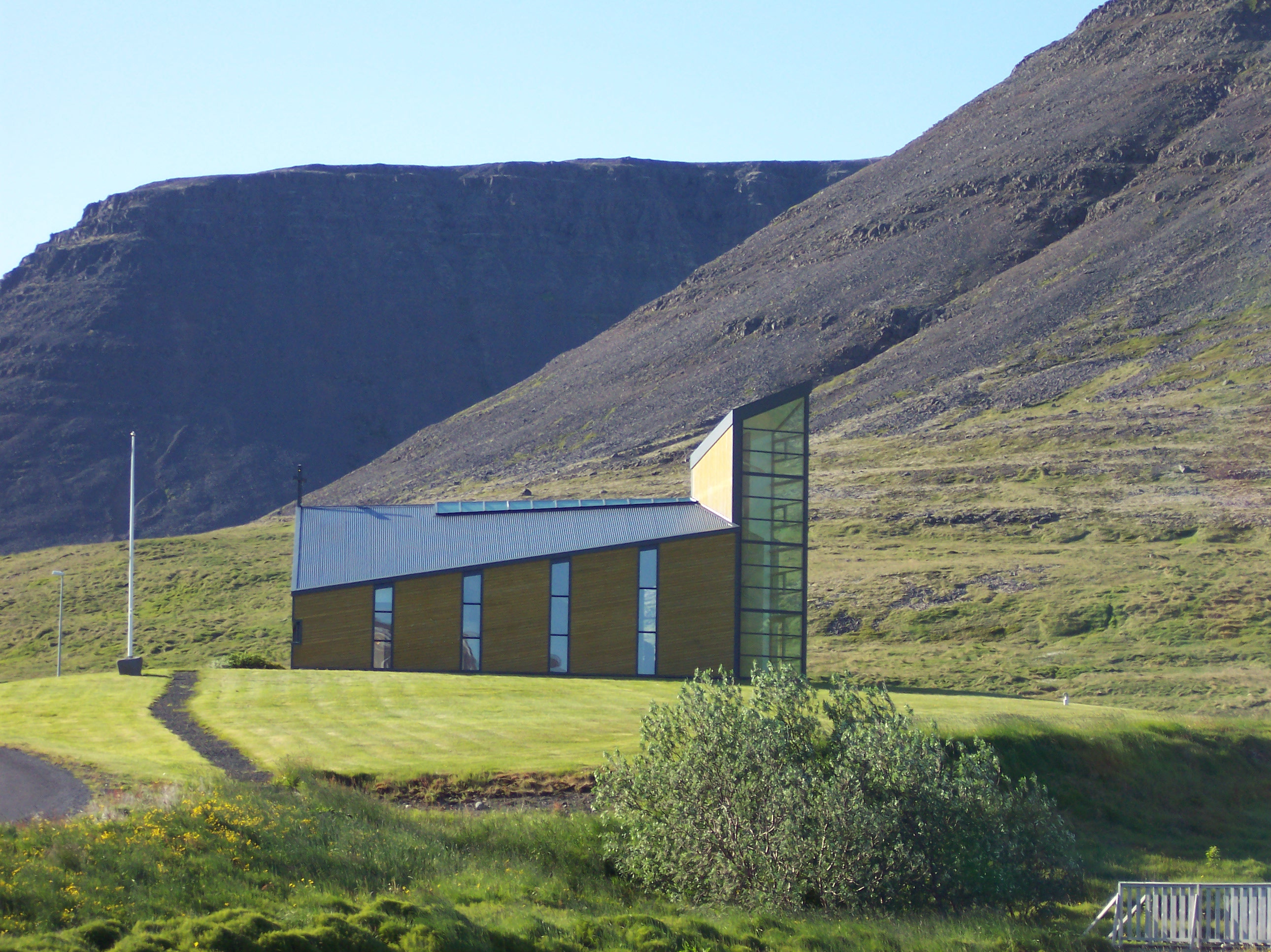
- Skyline of Tálknafjarðarhreppur

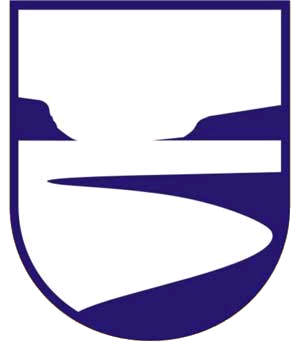
- Coat of arms

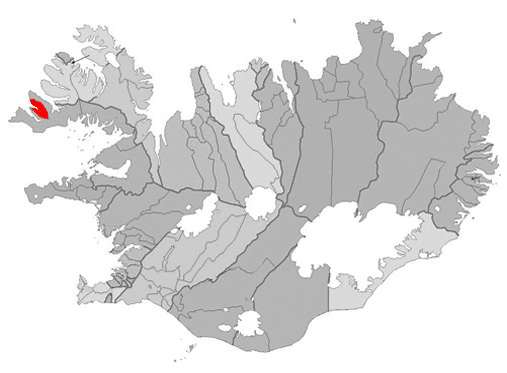
- Location of the municipality

- Location within Iceland
- Coordinates: 65.627159°N 23.823009°W
- Country: Iceland
- Region: Westfjords
- Constituency: Northwest Constituency

Government
  - Manager: Ólafur Þór Ólafsson

Area
  - Total: 176 km^{2} (68 sq mi)

Population (2024)
  - Total: 250
  - Density: 1.4/km^{2} (3.7/sq mi)
- Postal code(s): 460
- Municipal number: 4604
- Website: talknafjordur.is

Tálknafjarðarhreppur (Icelandic pronunciation: [ˈtʰaul̥knaˌfjarðar̥ˌr̥ɛhpʏr̥]) is a former municipality in Iceland. Its only settlement is Tálknafjörður. On the land side, the municipality had been surrounded by the municipality of Vesturbyggð.

In October 2023, residents voted to unify with Vesturbyggð. The unification officially took place in 2024.
