= Reykhólar =

- Village
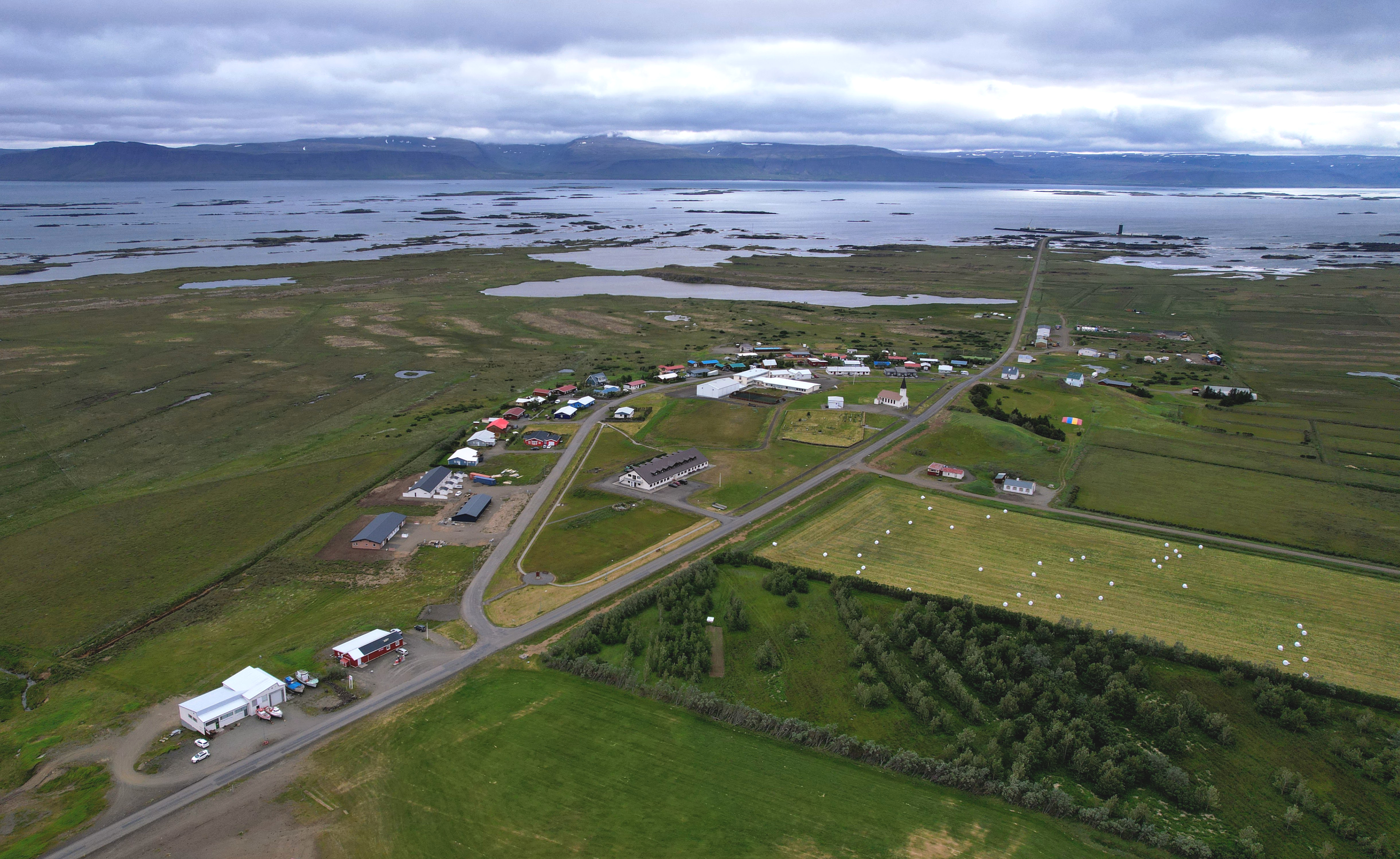
- Reykhólar

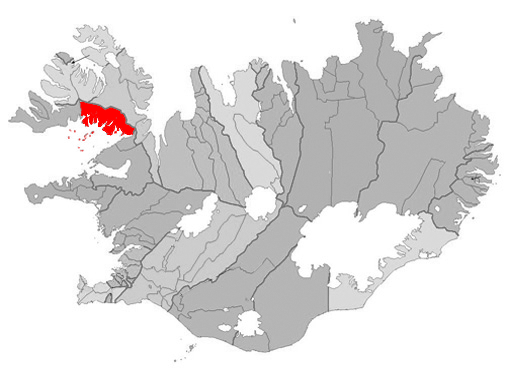
- Location of the Municipality of Reykhólahreppur

- Location in Iceland
- Coordinates: 65°27′N 22°12′W
- Country: Iceland
- Constituency: Northwest Constituency
- Region: Westfjords
- Municipality: Reykhólahreppur

Population (2024)
  - Total: 108
- Time zone: UTC+0 (GMT)
- Website: Official website

Reykhólar (Icelandic pronunciation: [ˈreikˌhouːlar̥]) is an Icelandic village in the Westfjords, in the northwest area of the country.

The village, with around 120 inhabitants, has a swimming pool near the local camp site with a great view on the sea and mountains. The camp site, hostel, and a tourist office are open during the summer.

Located south of Reykhólar, on a small island just offshore, is the plant of Norður & Co., a manufacturer of sea salt, evaporated from seawater by means of geothermal energy. This process was first tried on Breiðafjöður in 1753 and was selected by Søren Rosenkilde when he established Norður in 2012.

== See also ==
- Bjarkalundur
