= Vesturbyggð =

- Municipality
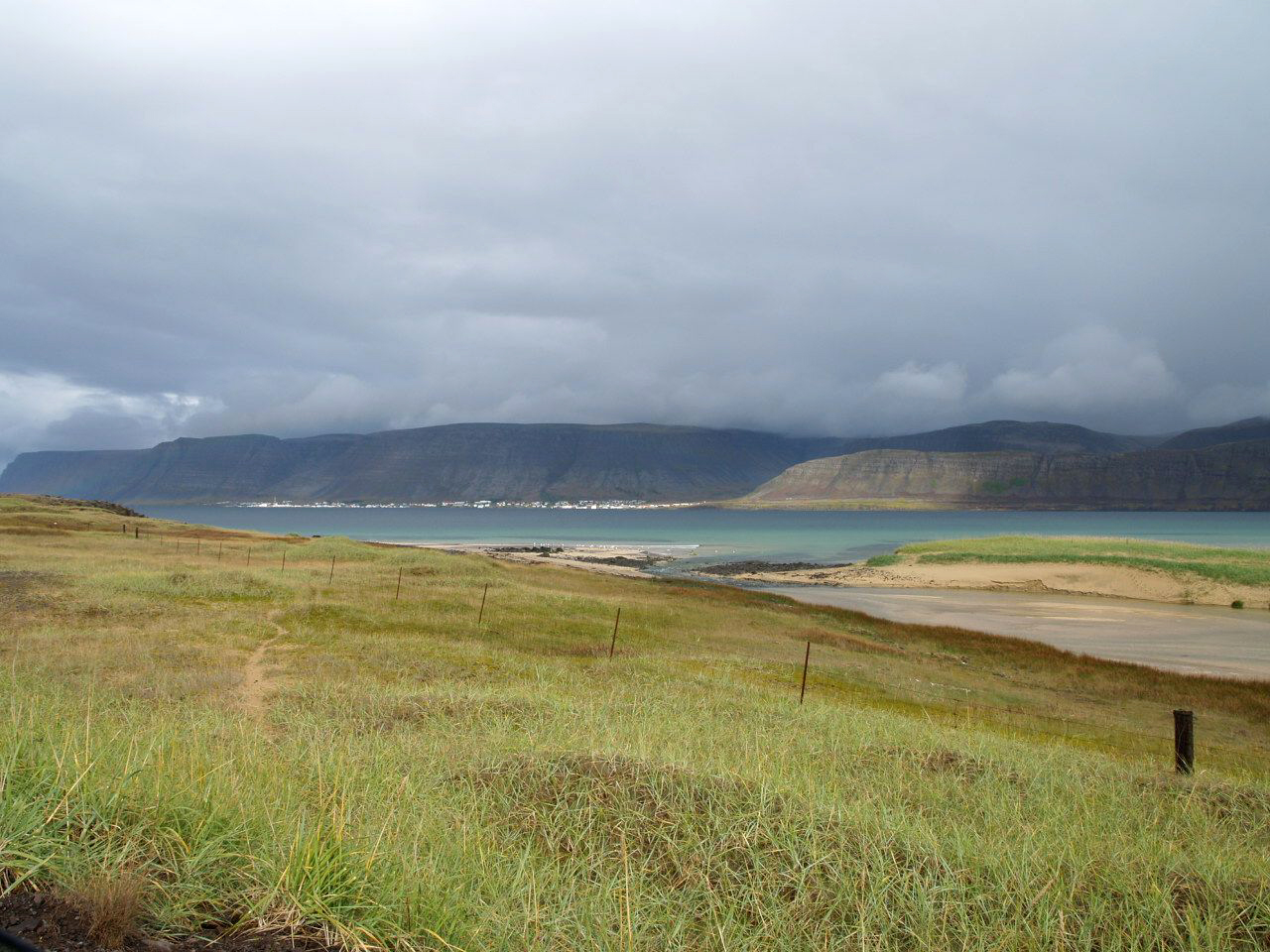
- View over Patreksfjörður

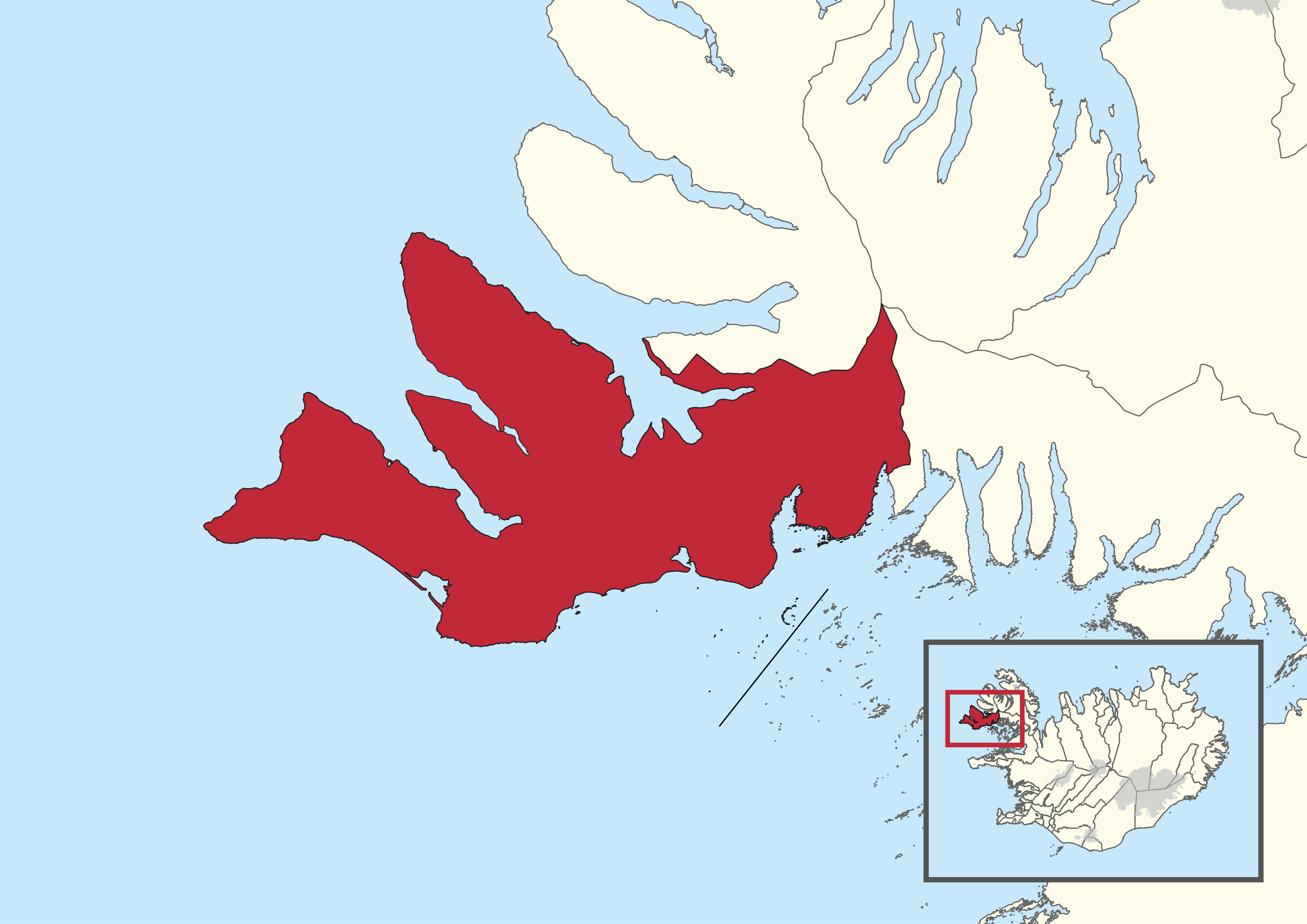
- Location of Vesturbyggð

- Location within Iceland
- Coordinates: 65.598°N 24.002°W
- Country: Iceland
- Region: Westfjords
- Constituency: Northwest Constituency

Government
  - Mayor: Gerður Björk Sveinsdóttir

Area
  - Total: 1,511 km^{2} (583 sq mi)

Population (1 August 2024)
  - Total: 1,447
  - Density: 0.9/km^{2} (2.3/sq mi)
- Postal code(s): 450, 451, 460, 465
- Municipal number: 4607
- Website: vesturbyggd.is

Vesturbyggð (Icelandic pronunciation: [ˈvɛstʏrˌpɪɣθ]) is a municipality located in the Westfjords in Iceland. The municipality includes the towns of Patreksfjörður, with 721 inhabitants; Tálknafjörður, with 261 inhabitants; Bíldudalur, with 238 inhabitants; and Krossholt, with 19 inhabitants. The municipality is served by Patreksfjörður Airport and Bíldudalur Airport.

In October 2023, residents voted to unify with Tálknafjarðarhreppur.

On 19 May 2024, Tálknafjörður municipality disbanded and the town joined the Vesturbyggð municipality.

== Twin towns – sister cities ==
Vesturbyggð terminated all its twinnings in 2018.

Previously it was twinned with:

- Nordfyn, Denmark
- Svelvik, Norway
- Vadstena, Sweden
- Naantali, Finland
