= Drangajökull =

Glacier in Iceland

Coordinates: 66°09′N 22°15′W

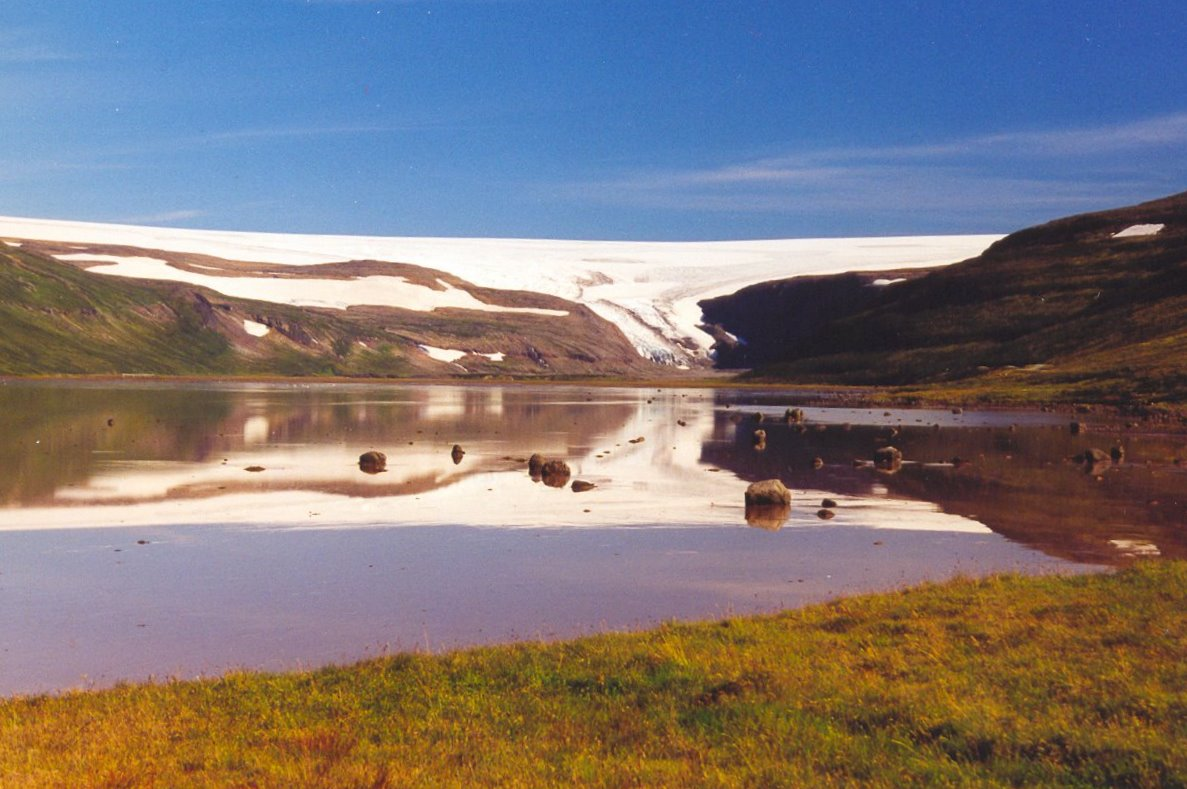
Drangajökull

Drangajökull (pronounced [ˈtrauŋkaˌjœːkʏtl̥], regionally also [ˈtraŋk-]) is the northernmost glacier of Iceland, occupying the southern foothills of the Hornstrandir peninsula in the Westfjords region. It covers approximately 150 km^{2} and is the only Icelandic ice cap situated entirely below 1,000 metres in elevation. Lake sediment cores show that Drangajökull persisted near or above its present extent well into the mid-Holocene before retreating to near-modern limits between about 9,500 and 7,200 years ago. Modern airborne LiDAR mapping indicates the glacier has lost roughly 1.19 km^{3} of ice—an average thinning of 8.0 metres—since around 1990, even as its surge-type outlet glaciers periodically advance.

== Holocene history ==
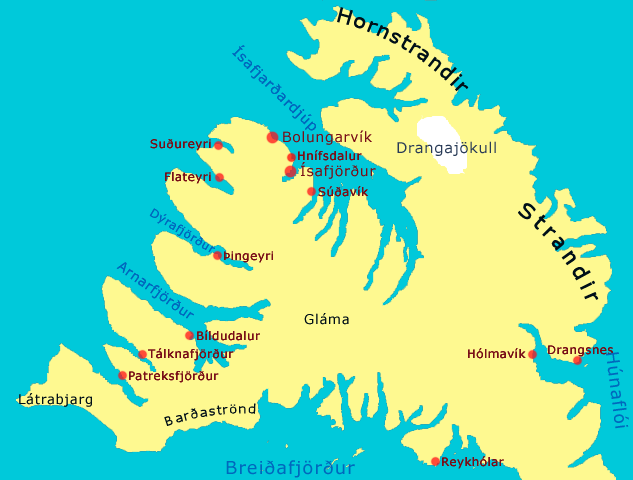
Location of Drangajökull within the Westfjords

Sediment cores recovered from seven lakes around Drangajökull reveal how the ice cap behaved during the early and middle Holocene. These "threshold lakes" acted like natural switches: when the glacier margin reached them, meltwater carried fine mineral sediments into the lake basins; when the ice retreated, lakes filled instead with organic‐rich mud, or gyttja. By examining the layers of minerogenic sediment versus gyttja, and by dating terrestrial plant remains and well‐known volcanic ash (tephra) deposits such as the Saksunarvatn layer (10,200 years ago), researchers have charted the timing of glacier advances and retreats. In the northern sector, for example, deposition of gyttja above the Saksunarvatn tephra shows that meltwater ceased to cross the mountain pass threshold by about, 300 years ago, indicating the ice margin had withdrawn beyond that point. In the eastern and southern catchments, organic sedimentation began between roughly 9,500 and 7,200 years ago, signalling that Drangajökull stayed larger than today well into the mid-Holocene before finally contracting to near its present extent.

The persistence of Drangajökull contrasts sharply with the histories of Iceland's two largest ice caps, Vatnajökull and Langjökull, which both shrank to their minimum extents during the Holocene Thermal Maximum (approximately 9,000–6,000 years ago). In contrast, Drangajökull's outlet glaciers continued to spill meltwater into their lakes through much of this warm interval. This anomaly appears to reflect the glacier's maritime setting on the Vestfirðir peninsula, where relatively cool summers and exceptionally high winter snowfall maintain a low equilibrium line elevation (the height above which snow accumulation exceeds melting) of around 550–600 metres.

Together, these findings suggest that Drangajökull is not merely a remnant of Iceland's Last Glacial Maximum but a Holocene‐persistent ice mass. Its survival through the warmest parts of the Holocene, and its surge-type behaviour resembling some Svalbard outlets, demonstrate the dominant role of winter precipitation—and not just summer temperature—in sustaining glacial ice in maritime Arctic environments.

== Modern monitoring and recent change ==
Since 2008, Drangajökull has been mapped by airborne Light Detection and Ranging (LiDAR), a laser-based surveying method that measures ice-surface elevation at fine scales. In July 2011, a complete 5 × 5 metre LiDAR grid was acquired with better than 0.5-metre vertical accuracy. Comparison of that 2011 model with a circa 1990 topographic map reveals a loss of about 1.19 km^{3} of ice—equivalent to an average thinning of roughly 8.0 metres across the cap. When expressed as mass balance, this corresponds to about –0.35 metre water-equivalent per year (the depth of water produced if the lost ice were melted).

Although Drangajökull's overall volume has declined, its three main outlet glaciers show surge-type behaviour. In each case, the advancing terminus gained several metres of thickness, while the same glacier's source area thinned by tens of metres. This contrasting pattern underscores the complex interplay between dynamic ice flow and regional climate. The precision and repeatability of LiDAR surveys make them an invaluable tool for detecting ongoing changes in maritime glaciers such as Drangajökull.

== See also ==
- Fjords of Iceland
- Glaciers of Iceland
