= Hornstrandir =

Peninsula in Iceland

Coordinates: 66°23′N 22°30′W

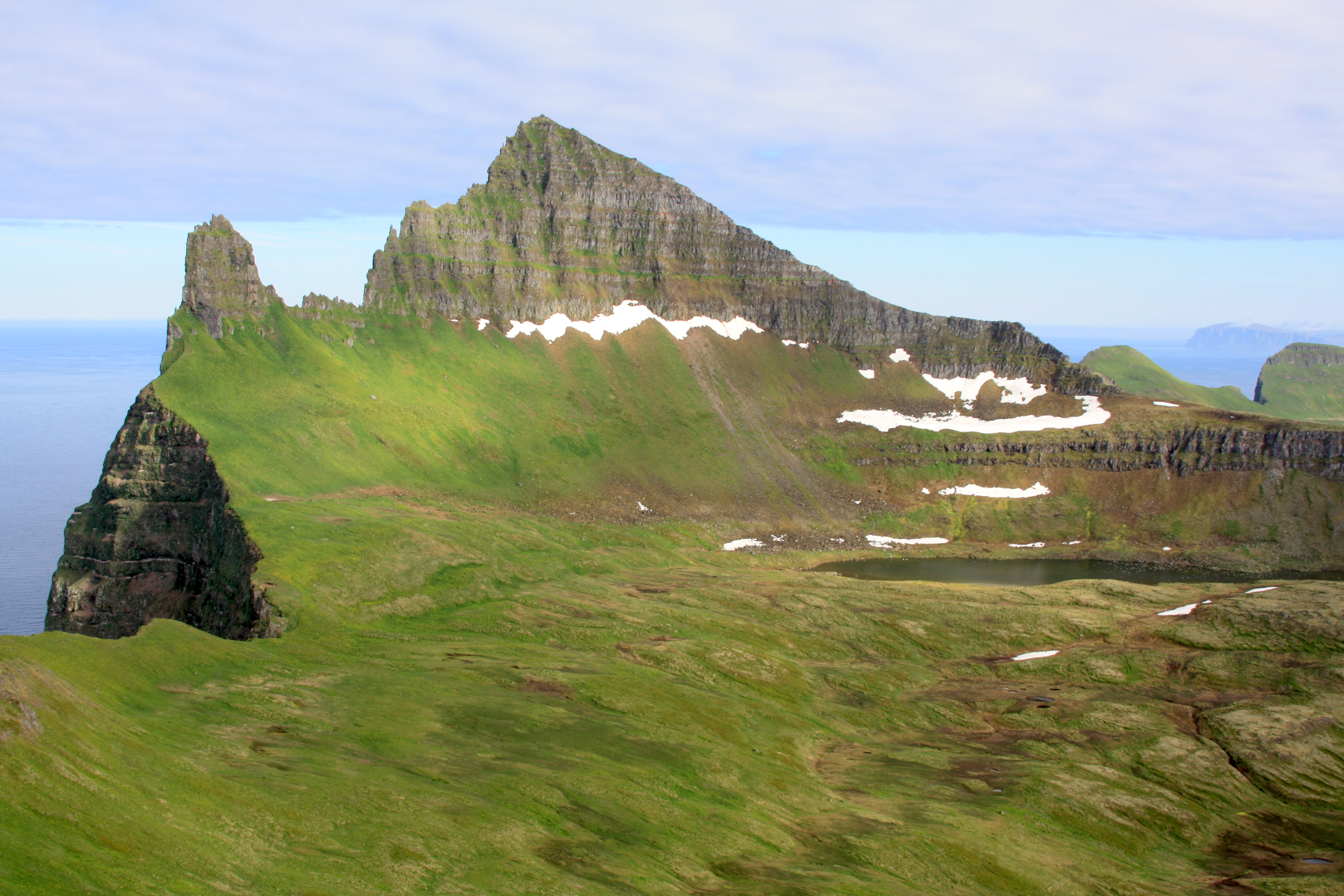
Hornbjarg in Hornstrandir

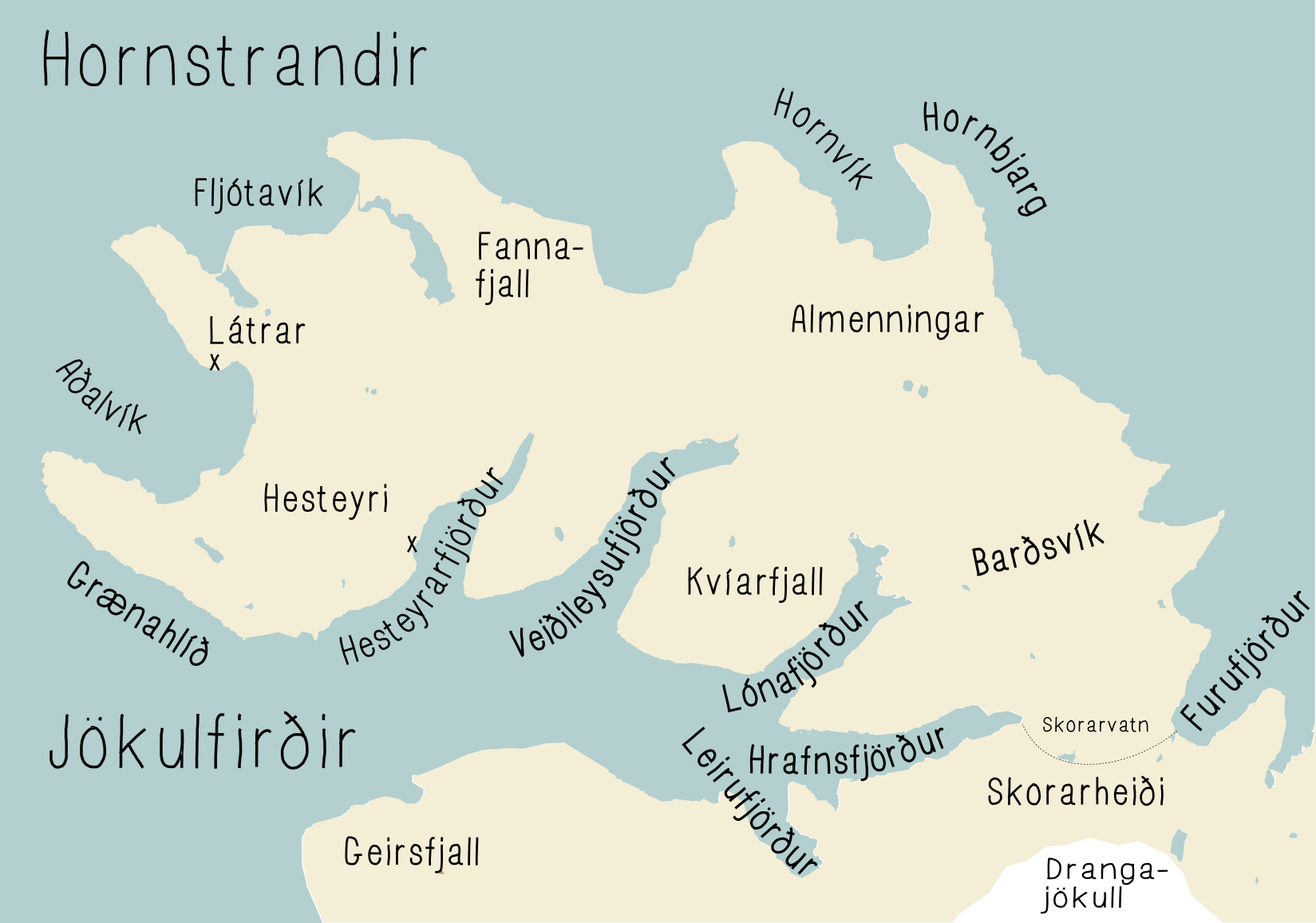
Hornstrandir peninsula and Jökulfirðir

Hornstrandir (Icelandic pronunciation: [ˈhɔ(r)tn̥ˌstrandɪr̥]) is Iceland's northernmost peninsula, covering 580 km^{2} (220 sq mi) at the northern end of the Westfjords, to the north of the Jökulfirðir and to the northwest of Drangajökull glacier.

== Ecosystem ==
The area covers 580 km^{2} (220 sq mi) of tundra, fjord, glacier and alpine land with rich but fragile vegetation, and protected as Hornstrandir Nature Reserve since 1975, under some of the strictest preservation rules in Iceland. The area's nature thrived as very few people resided there. In the 1950s, the handful of its residents who were based on agricultural livelihood left. However, decades later, some of their descendants returned and rebuilt their old houses, and much of the land is privately owned.

Jökulfirðir, meaning Glacier Fjords, is the formation of five fjords and bays, four of which consist the entire southern land and most twisted coastline of Hornstrandir while the fifth (Leirufjörður) lies just south of the peninsula. From west to east, the four fjords consisting the south shore are Hesteyrarfjörður, Veiðileysufjörður, Lónafjörður, and Hrafnsfjörður, with the last forming the southwestern tip separating Hornstrandir from the rest of the Westfjords.

== Tourism ==
Hornstrandir attracts both half-day visitors and hikers, and has three main attractions. One attraction is the bird cliffs surrounding the bay of Hornvík, reaching a height of more than 500 metres on the bay's eastern side and described as "a magnet of gigantic proportions" for teeming of birds. Second, what is described as an "unmatched pure and tranquil nature" and "strong sense of remoteness" for lack of infrastructure and few tourists in relation to the "sheer size" of the area; and that people can hike for days without seeing any other person. The third, which stems from the previous two, along with hunting-ban, is the land being a haven for the Arctic fox, with a description of high probability to spot one.

== Gallery ==
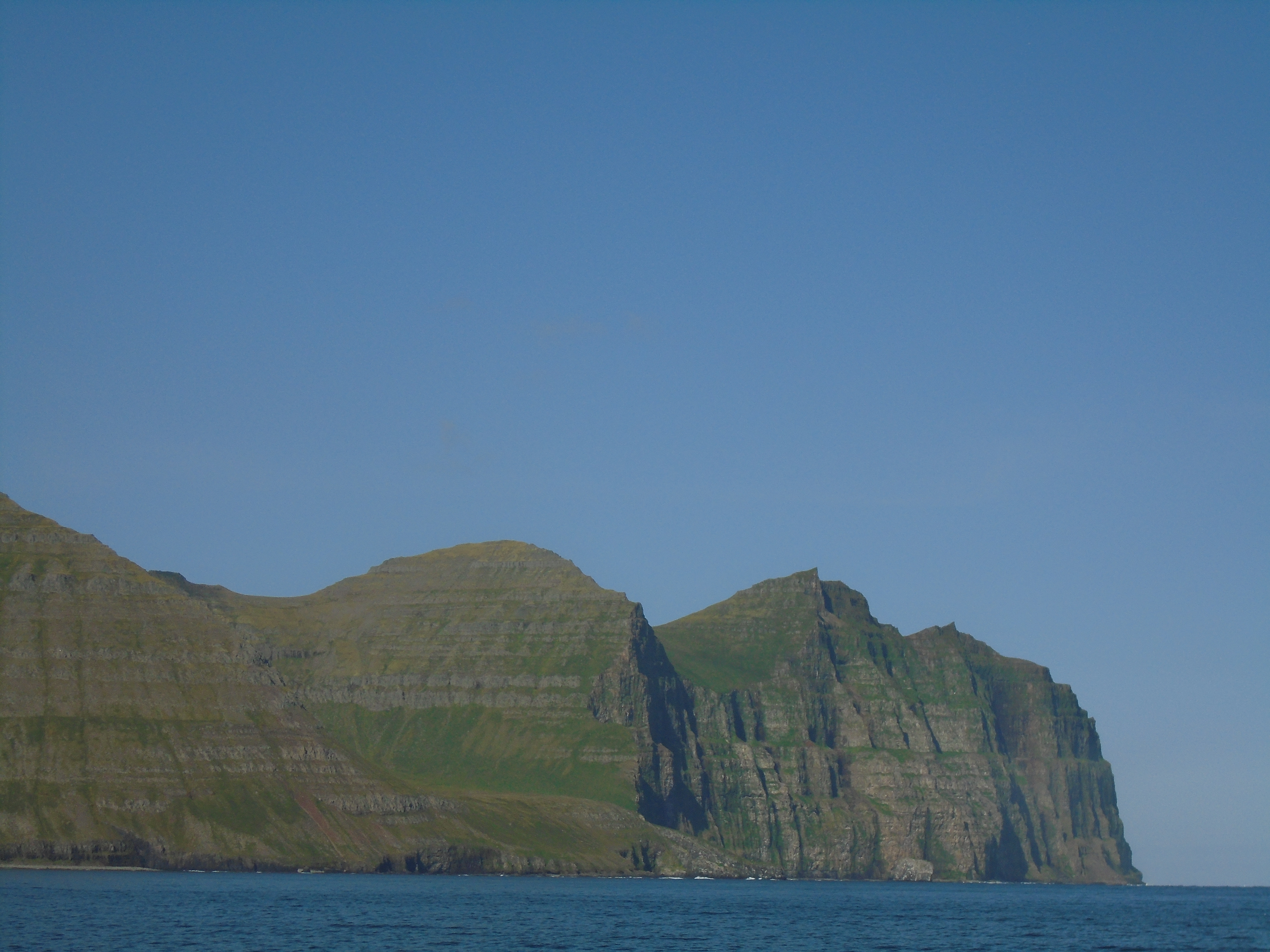

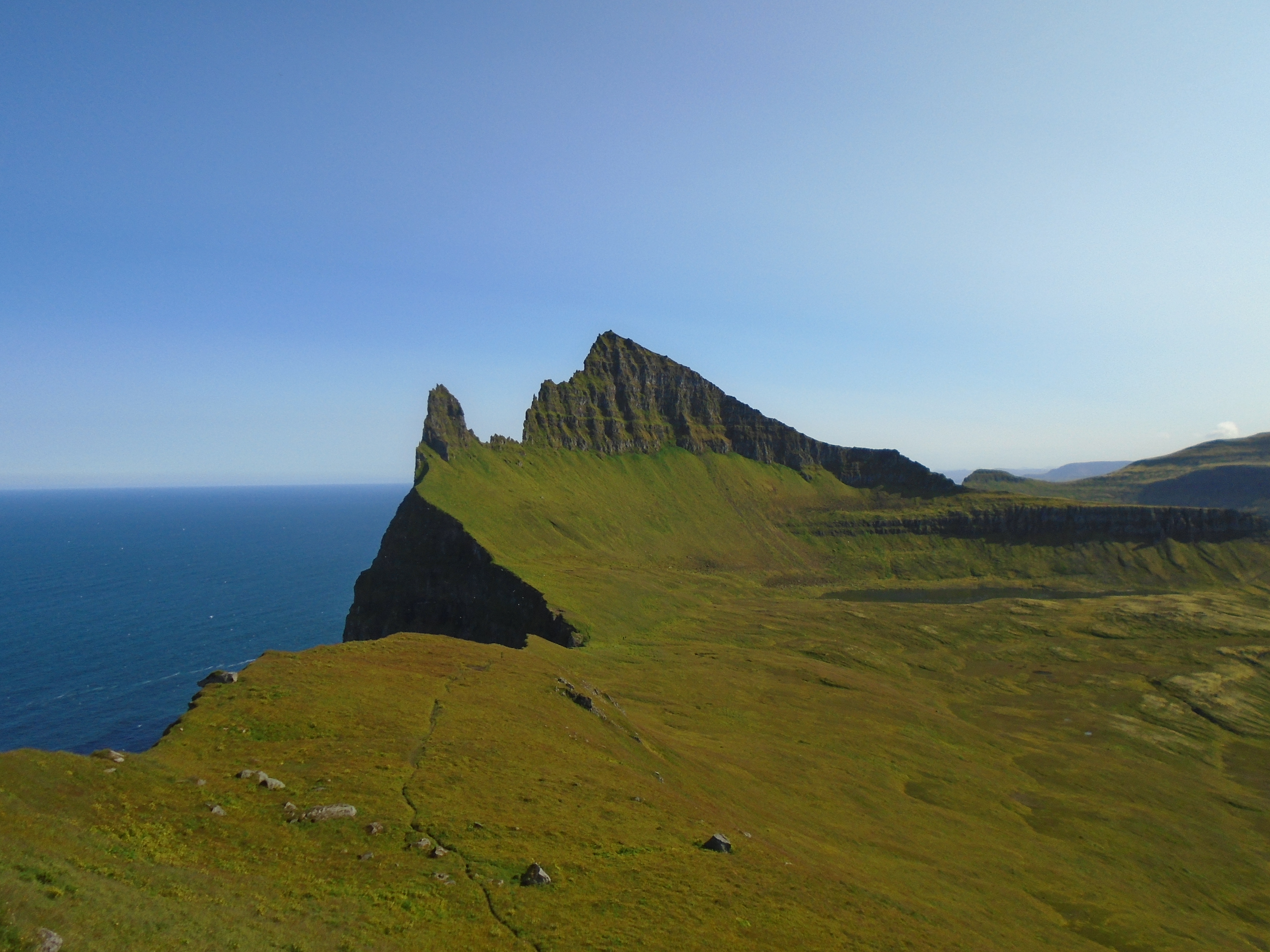

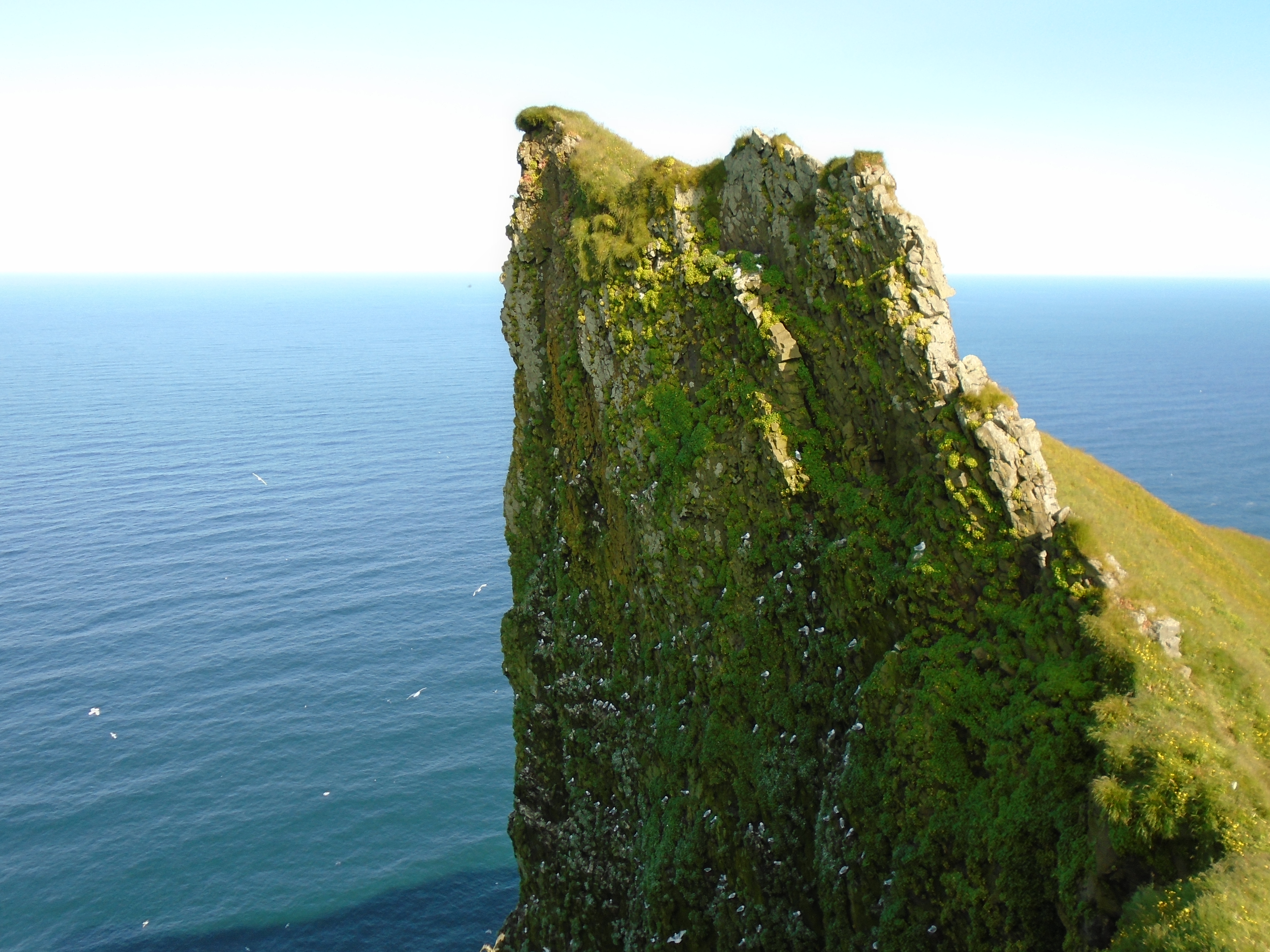

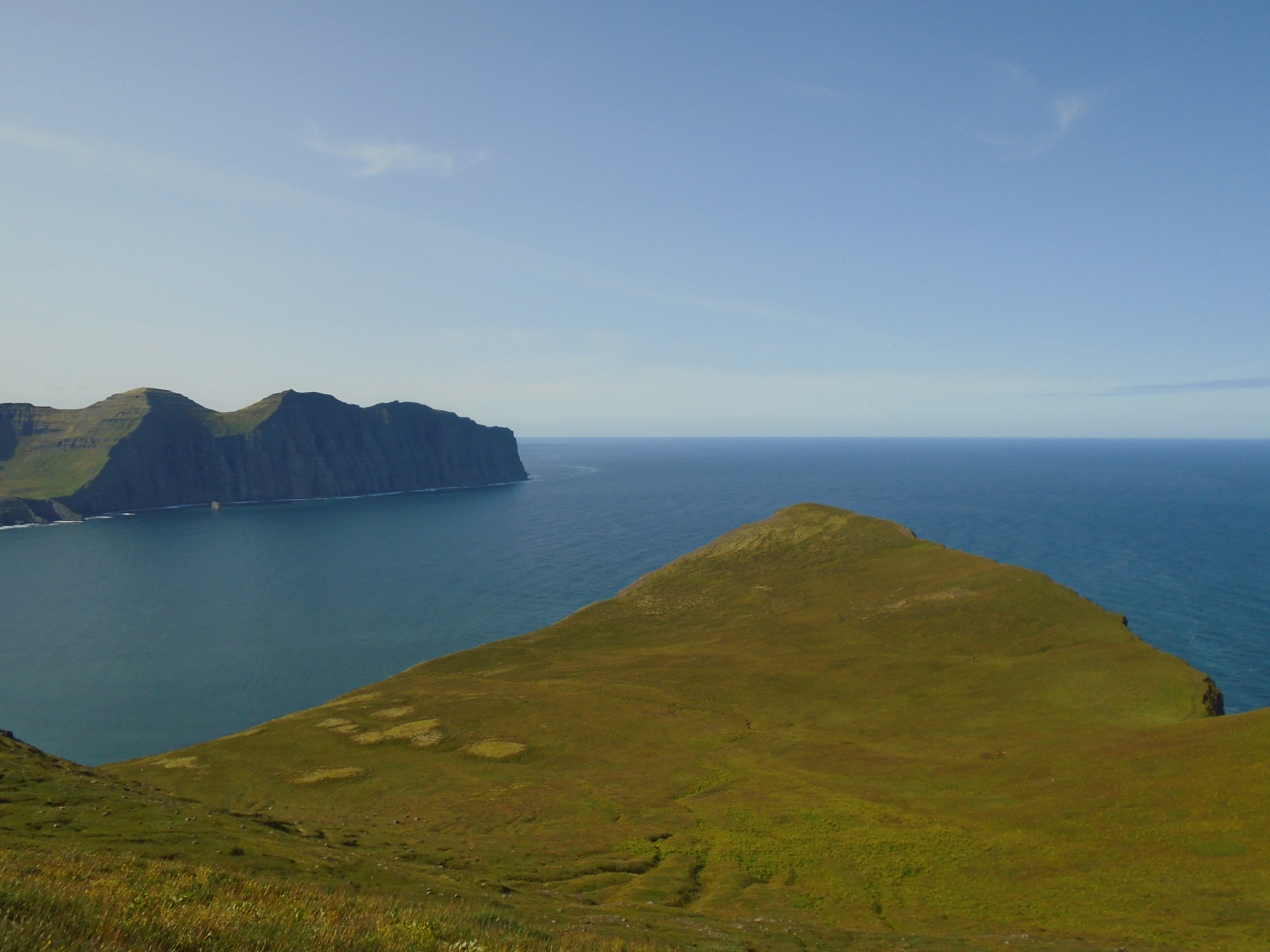
