= Bjarkalundur =

Estate in Iceland

Coordinates: 65°56′N 22°10′W

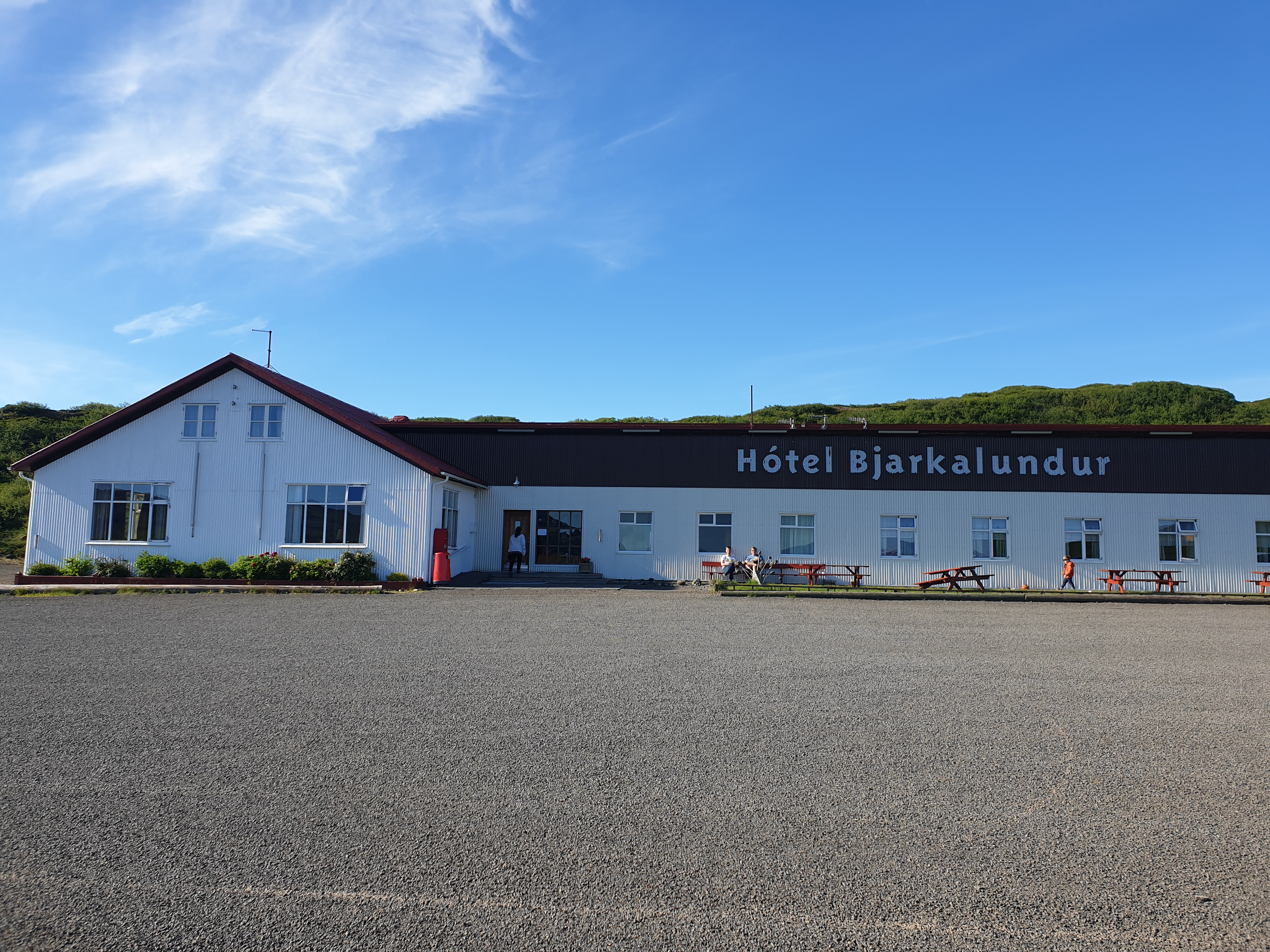
The hotel

Bjarkalundur (Icelandic pronunciation: [ˈpjar̥kaˌlʏntʏr̥]) is an estate located in the southeastern part of the Westfjords, Iceland. The estate contains the oldest summer hotel in Iceland, built in 1945–1947. A few kilometers from Bjarkalundur is the village of Reykhólar.
