= Drangsnes =

- Village
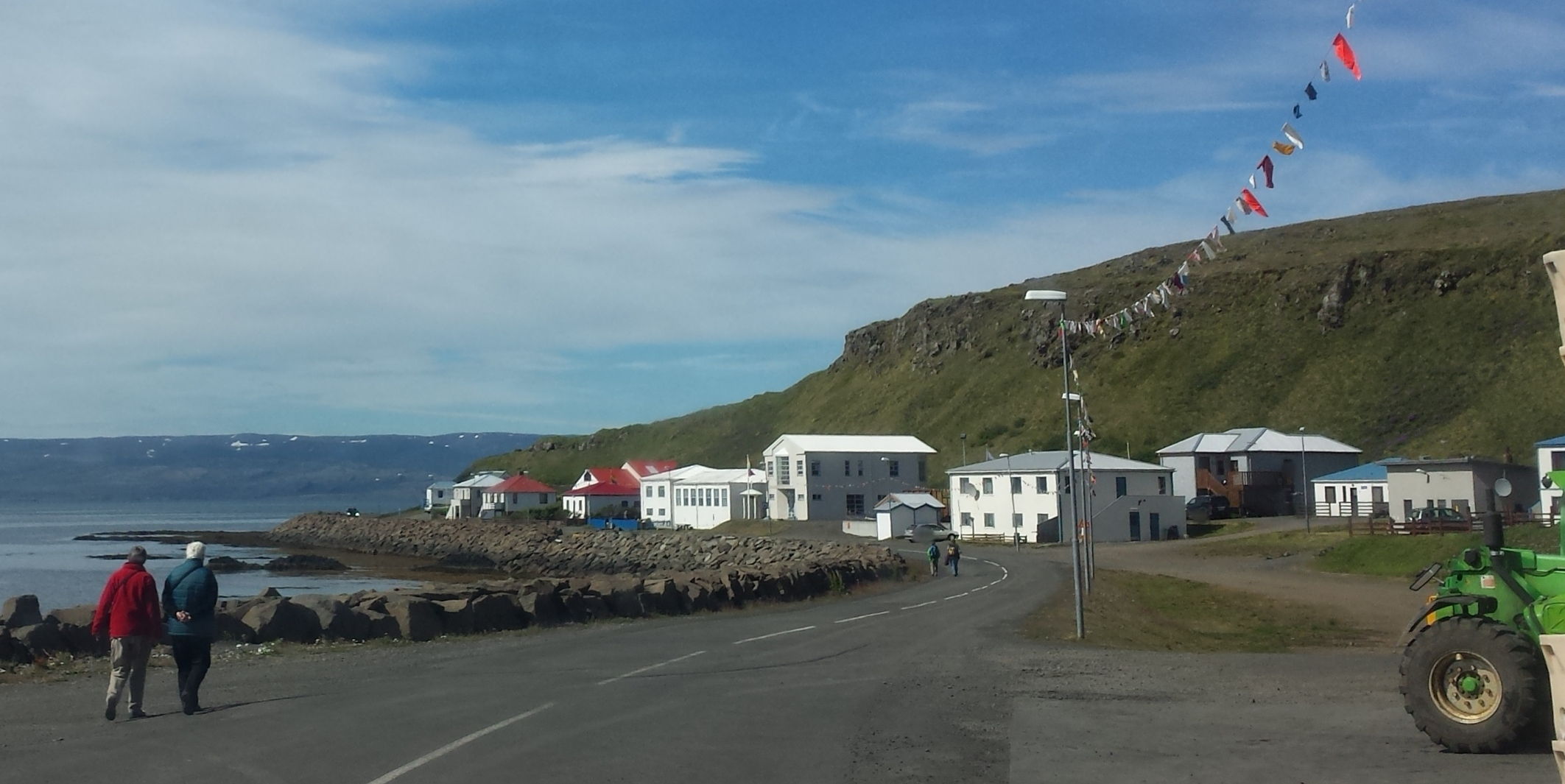
- Drangsnes in 2016

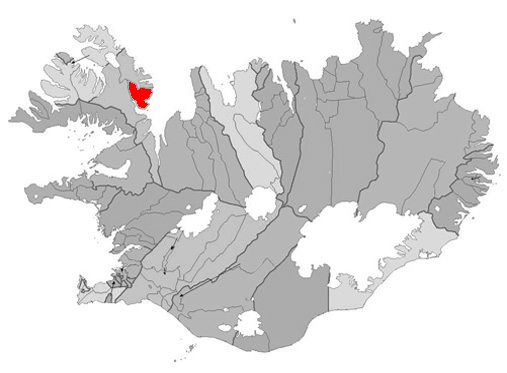
- Location of the Municipality of Kaldrananeshreppur

- Location of Drangsnes within Kaldrananeshreppur
- Coordinates: 65°41′N 21°27′W
- Country: Iceland
- Constituency: Northwest Constituency
- Region: Westfjords
- Municipality: Kaldrananeshreppur

Population (January 2011)
  - Total: 67
- Time zone: UTC+0 (GMT)
- Póstnúmer: 520
- Website: Official website

Drangsnes (Icelandic pronunciation: [ˈtrauŋsˌnɛːs], regionally also [ˈtraŋs-]) is a small town in the northwestern part of Iceland, at the mouth of Steingrímsfjörður and around 11.21 km (6.96 mi) from Hólmavík.

It is part of the Kaldrananeshreppur municipality and only has 67 inhabitants (2011 census). It got its name from a tall rock named Kerling of what is said that it is one of three troll women who tried to separate the Westfjords from the rest of Iceland.

== Places in Drangsnes ==
- Pottarnir á Drangsnesi
- Drangsnes Tjaldsvæði
- Kerlingin
- Malarhornsviti
- Frisbígolfvöllurinn Drangsnesi
