= Hornvík =

Bay in Iceland

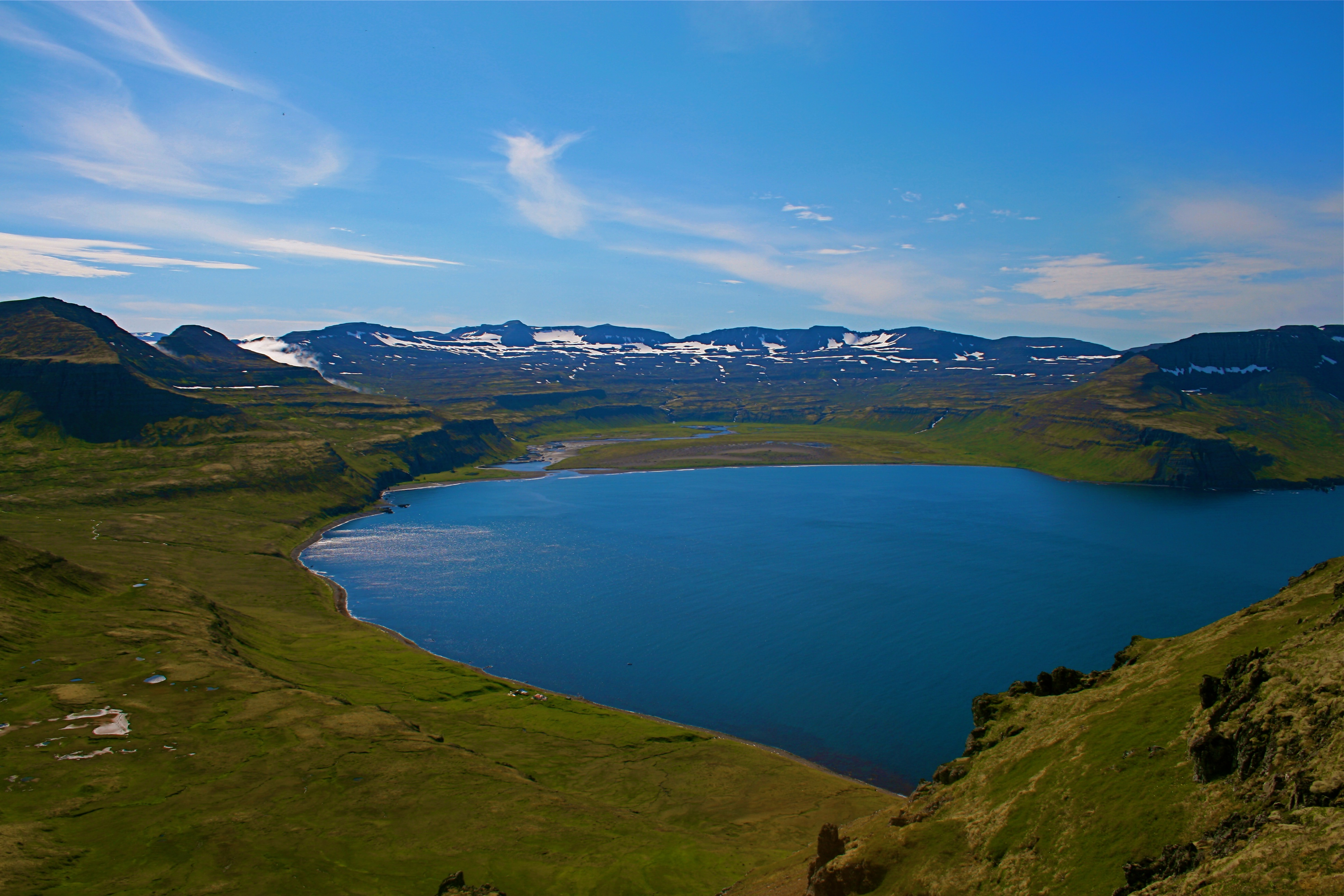
- A view of Hornvík.

- Location within Iceland
- Location: Hornstrandir, Iceland
- Coordinates: 66.45°N 22.51°W

Hornvík is bay in Hornstrandir, Iceland, which lies between Hælavíkurbjarg and Hornbjarg. The bay hosted three settlements, Horn (deserted 1946), Höfn (deserted 1944) and Rekavík bak Höfn (deserted 1944).
