= Patreksfjörður =

Village in the Westfjords of Iceland

- Village
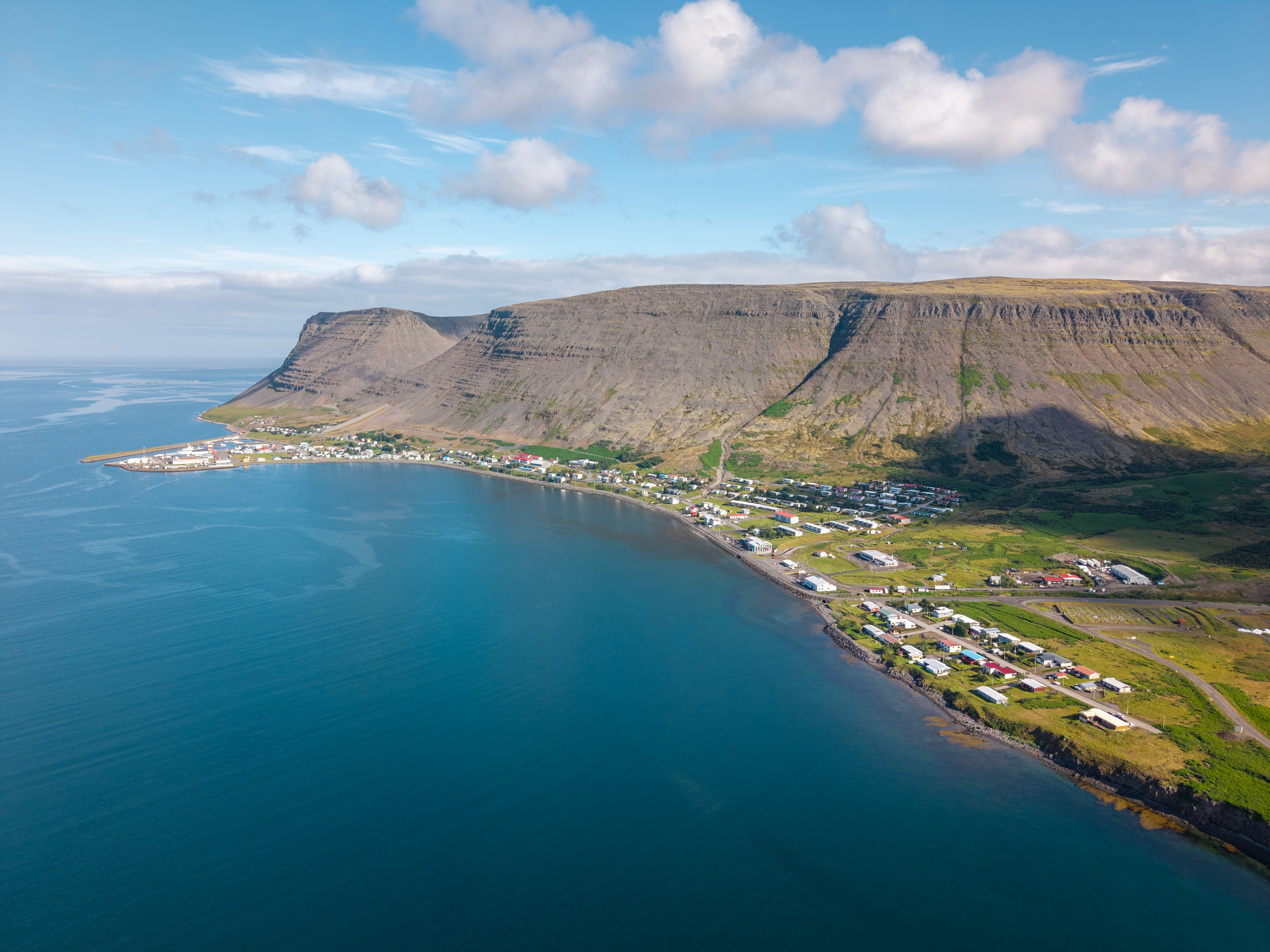
- Overhead view of Patreksfjörður in 2025

- Location within Iceland
- Coordinates: 65°35′43″N 23°59′5″W
- Country: Iceland
- Constituency: Northwest
- Region: Westfjords
- Municipality: Vesturbyggð

Population (2022)
  - Total: 720
- Time zone: UTC+0 (GMT)
- Postal code: 450

Patreksfjörður (Icelandic pronunciation: [ˈpʰaːtrɛksˌfjœrðʏr̥], lit. 'Patrick's fjord') is a fishing village in the Westfjords of Iceland. It was an important fishing and trading post until the Icelandic government's introduction of a fishing quota in 1990. Administratively, it is part of the municipality of Vesturbyggð. It is the westernmost settlement of Iceland.

== Etymology ==
According to the Landnámabók (Book of Settlements) – a medieval record of Norse settlements in Iceland – Patreksfjörður was named after Bishop Patrick of the Hebrides who was the spiritual guide of Örlygur Hrappson, the first settler of the area who also came from the Hebrides.

== History ==
Patreksfjörður has been settled by farmers since at least the 9th century. However, like most coastal villages, it did not grow to the size of a village until the late 18th century, when Iceland experienced a fishing boom. The village became an important fishing and trading post and experienced another fishing boom at the turn of the 20th century. In 1990, the introduction of a national fishing quota by the Icelandic government prompted many residents of the historically self-sufficient village to leave.

== Geography ==
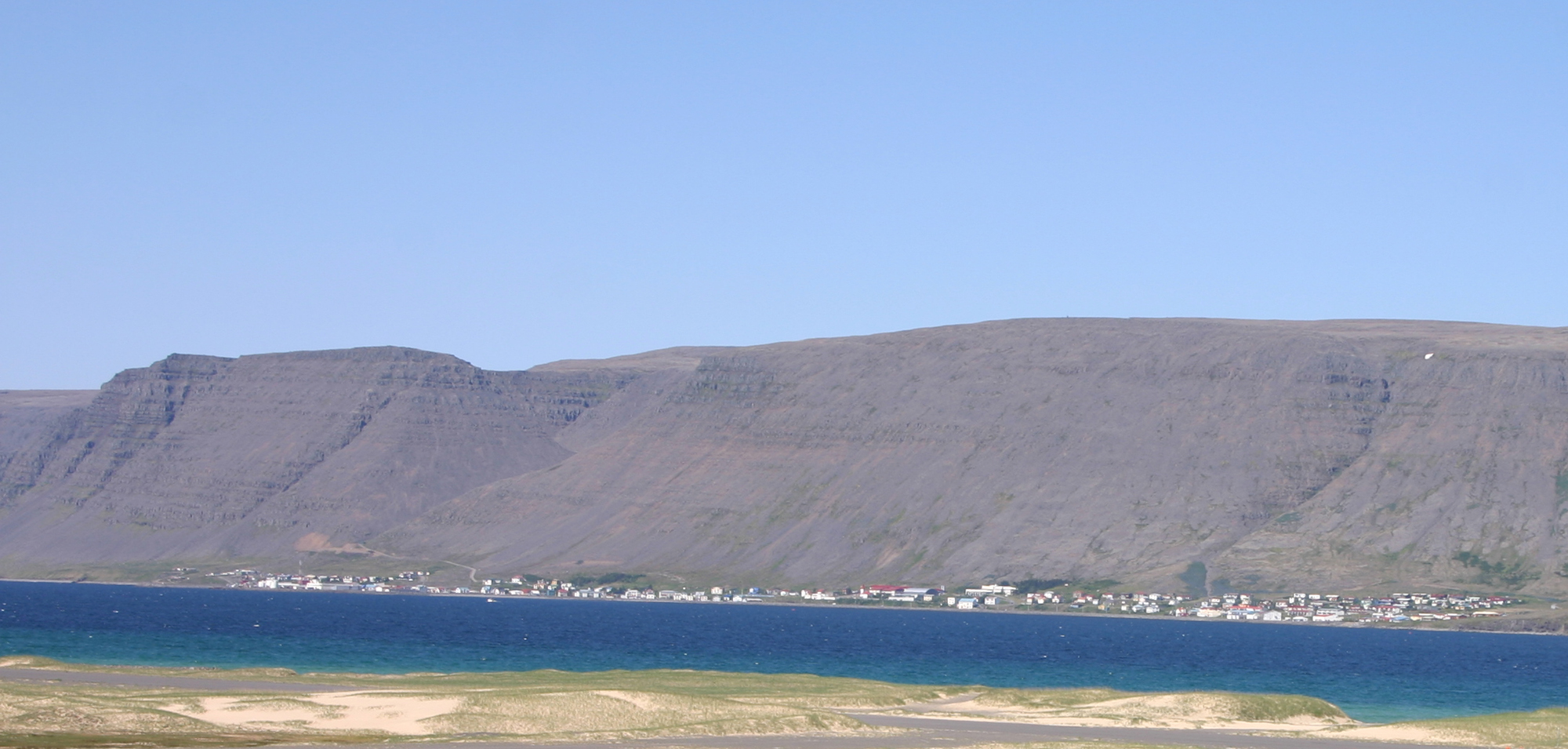
View of Patreksfjörður from the sea

Patreksfjörður is located in the south of the Westfjords peninsula, 400 kilometres (250 mi) from the Icelandic capital Reykjavík. Administratively, Patreksfjörður is part of the municipality of Vesturbyggð, along with Tálknafjörður and Bíldudalur. It is the westernmost settlement of Iceland.

The Látrabjarg cliffs, Rauðisandur beach, and Dynjandi waterfalls are situated nearby. Natural hot springs and an outdoor swimming pool are also within driving distance of the village center.

=== Climate ===
Patreksfjörður has a tundra climate.

Climate data for Kvígindisdalur, 4.7 km (2.9 mi) from Patreksfjörður (1961–1990)
Month	Jan	Feb	Mar	Apr	May	Jun	Jul	Aug	Sep	Oct	Nov	Dec	Year
Record high °C (°F)	10.4 (50.7)	10.5 (50.9)	10.5 (50.9)	12.5 (54.5)	18.6 (65.5)	21.0 (69.8)	20.5 (68.9)	21.0 (69.8)	18.0 (64.4)	16.2 (61.2)	11.7 (53.1)	11.5 (52.7)	21.0 (69.8)
Mean daily maximum °C (°F)	1.2 (34.2)	1.7 (35.1)	1.4 (34.5)	3.9 (39.0)	7.3 (45.1)	10.1 (50.2)	11.7 (53.1)	11.7 (53.1)	8.8 (47.8)	5.7 (42.3)	2.8 (37.0)	1.5 (34.7)	5.6 (42.2)
Daily mean °C (°F)	−1.2 (29.8)	−0.7 (30.7)	−1.2 (29.8)	1.3 (34.3)	4.7 (40.5)	7.8 (46.0)	9.4 (48.9)	9.2 (48.6)	6.3 (43.3)	3.6 (38.5)	0.7 (33.3)	−0.9 (30.4)	3.3 (37.8)
Mean daily minimum °C (°F)	−3.8 (25.2)	−3.1 (26.4)	−3.5 (25.7)	−1.0 (30.2)	2.3 (36.1)	5.6 (42.1)	7.3 (45.1)	7.2 (45.0)	4.3 (39.7)	1.7 (35.1)	−1.6 (29.1)	−3.4 (25.9)	1.0 (33.8)
Record low °C (°F)	−17.4 (0.7)	−17.0 (1.4)	−18.5 (−1.3)	−18.0 (−0.4)	−9.4 (15.1)	−2.7 (27.1)	1.5 (34.7)	0.2 (32.4)	−4.0 (24.8)	−9.2 (15.4)	−12.0 (10.4)	−16.0 (3.2)	−18.5 (−1.3)
Average precipitation mm (inches)	129.3 (5.09)	126.0 (4.96)	124.2 (4.89)	112.1 (4.41)	62.7 (2.47)	79.1 (3.11)	82.2 (3.24)	97.4 (3.83)	116.8 (4.60)	161.9 (6.37)	148.4 (5.84)	136.8 (5.39)	1,376.9 (54.2)
Source: Icelandic Met Office (extremes 1956–2004)

== Architecture ==
Most houses in Patreksfjörður were built in the 1950s, 1960s and 1970s.

== Demographics ==
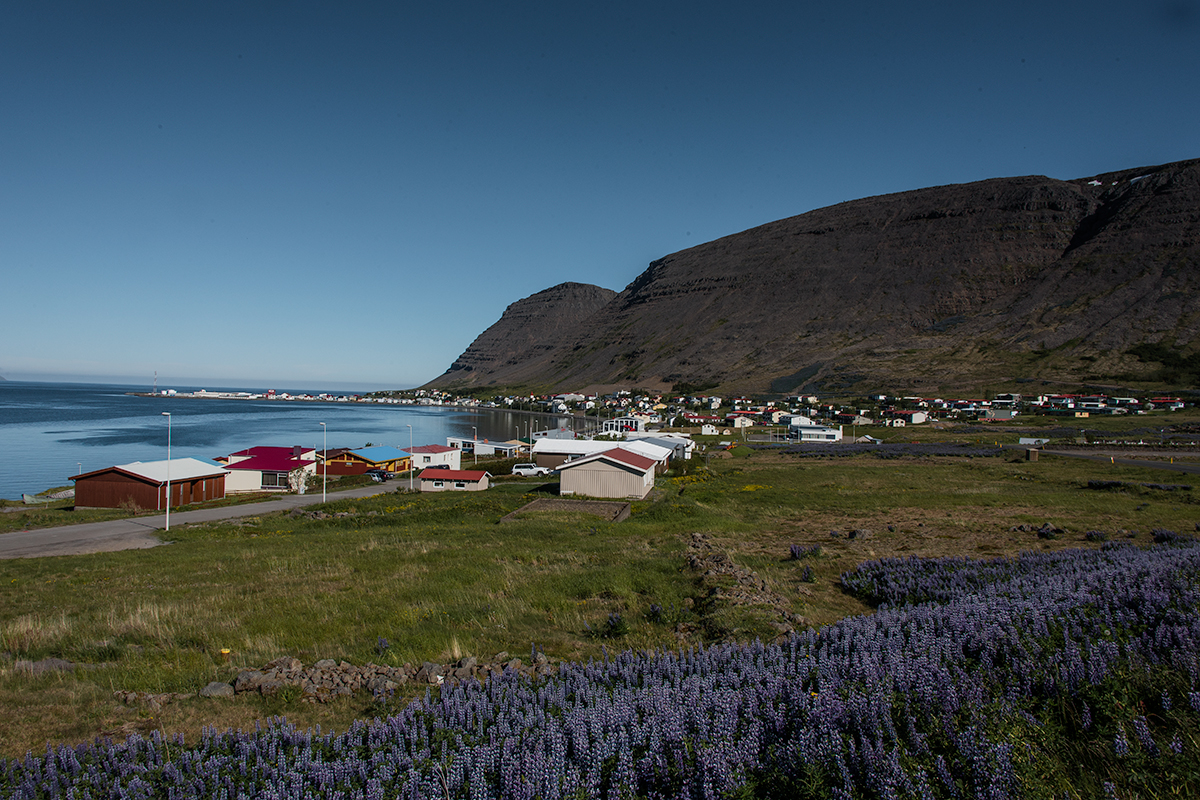
Patreksfjörður in 2015

The population of Patreksfjörður declined following the imposition of a national fishing quota by the Icelandic government. In 1981, the village had about 1,000 residents; as of January 2022, the population was approximately 720 people.

== Economy ==
Despite the fishing quota, fishing and fish processing are still the primary economic activities of Patreksfjörður. Salmon fishing in particular has grown in popularity. Tourism is also a growing industry in the village, with many residents working in the service sector.

== Education ==
Snæfellsnes Peninsula High School has a small branch in Patreksfjörður.

== Transport ==
The nearest airport with scheduled flights is Bíldudalur Airport, 36 km (22 mi) from Patreksfjörður. There are scheduled buses from Patreksfjörður to Bíldudalur Airport, as well as to the nearby villages of Bíldudalur and Tálknafjörður. Patreksfjörður Airport was an airport located across the fjord, about 5 km (3 mi) south of the town; it closed in 2011 after being non-operational since 2000.

== Notable people ==
- Leiknir Jónsson, Olympic swimmer

== See also ==
- Patreksfjörður farmed salmon escape
