= Tálknafjörður =

- Village
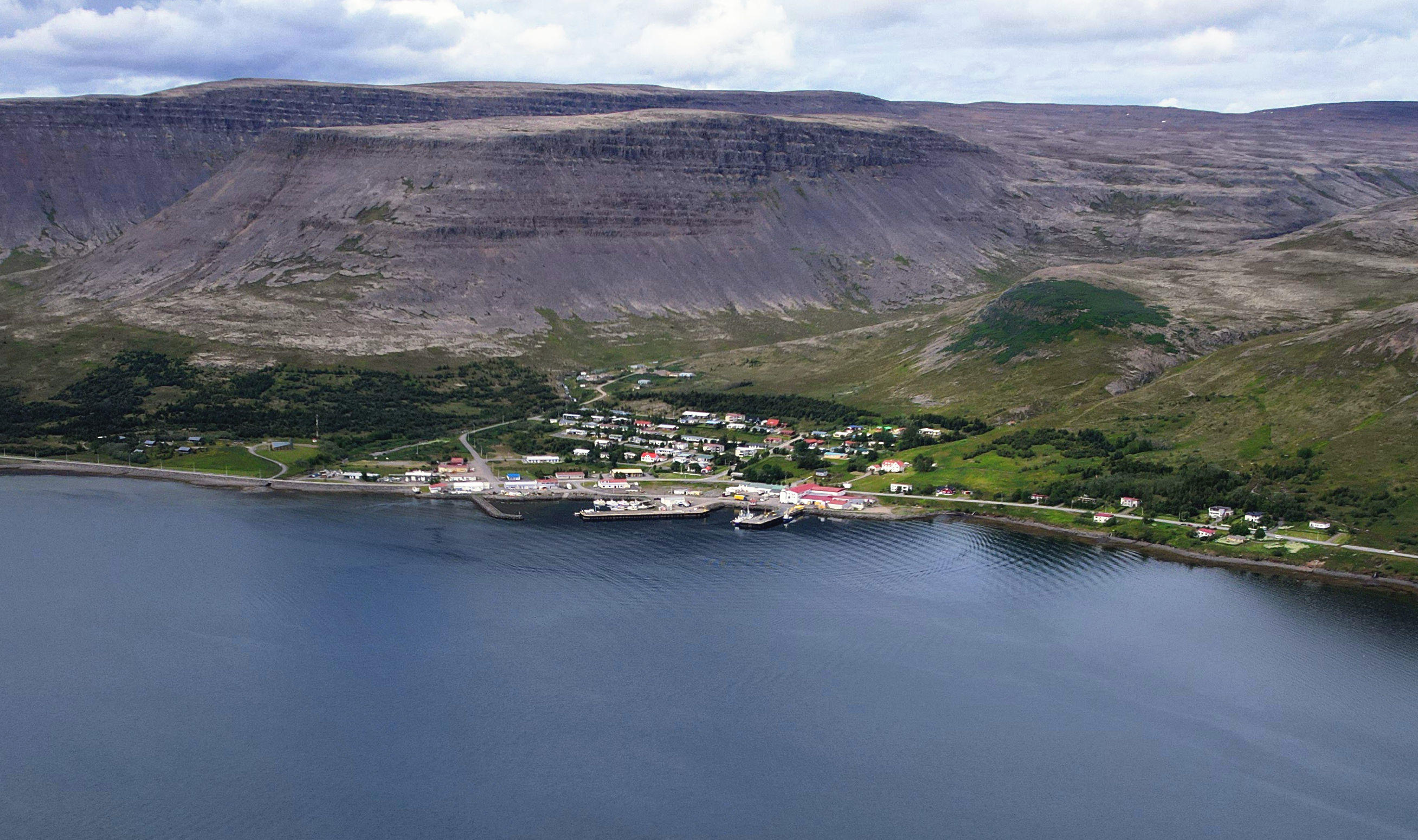
- Nicknames: Tálknó, Fjörðurinn, heimalandið
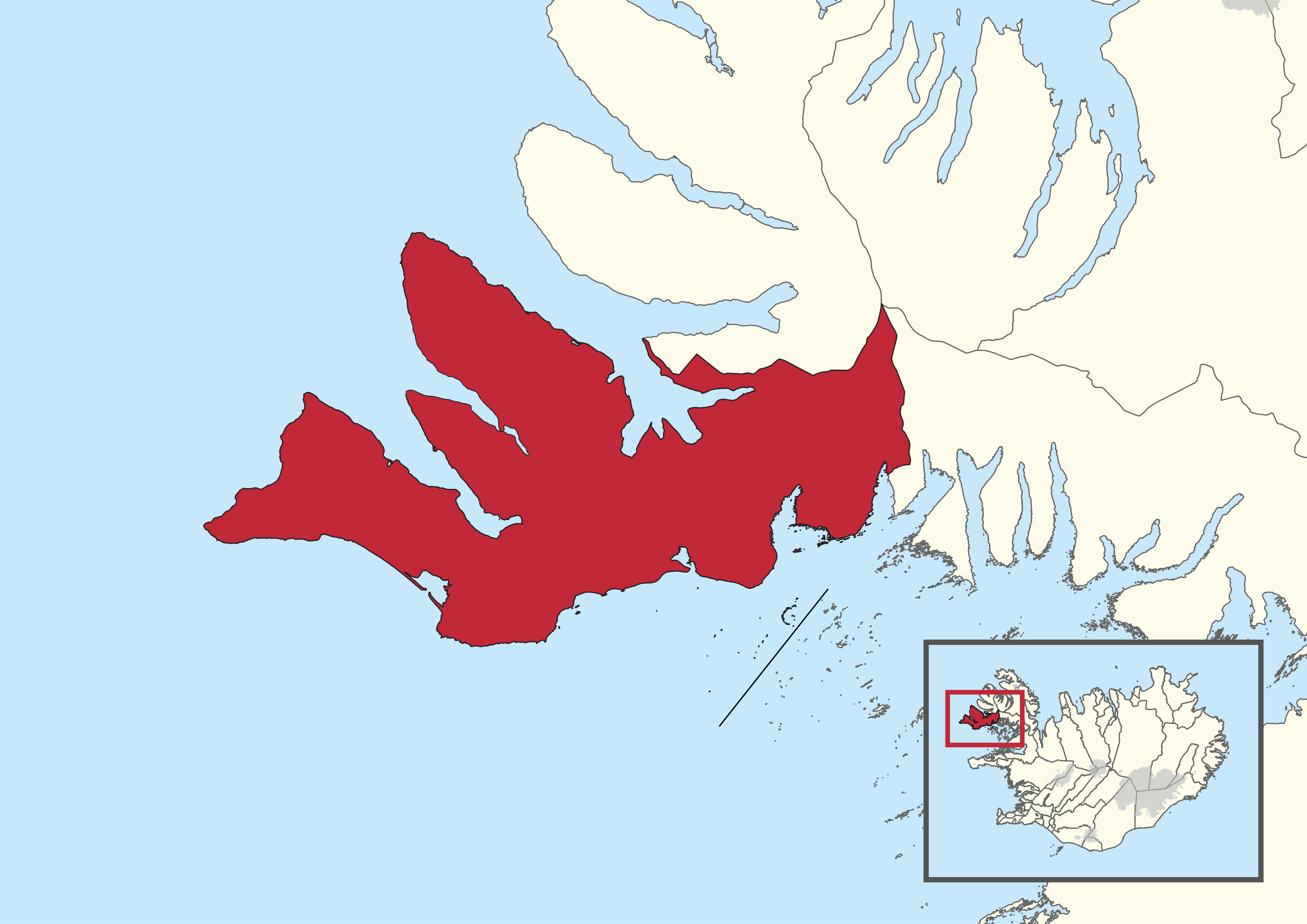
- Location of the Municipality of Vesturbyggð

- Location within Iceland
- Coordinates: 65°39′N 23°58′W
- Country: Iceland
- Constituency: Northwest Constituency
- Region: Westfjords
- Municipality: Vesturbyggð

Population (January 2024)
  - Total: 234
- Time zone: UTC+0 (GMT)
- Póstnúmer: 460
- Website: Official website

Tálknafjörður (Icelandic pronunciation: [ˈtʰaul̥knaˌfjœrðʏr̥]) is a fjord located in southern Westfjords between Patreksfjörður and Bíldudalur in Iceland.

The term is also used for the immediate village and the former municipality of Tálknafjarðarhreppur. In January 2024, the municipality had 250 inhabitants, of whom 234 lived within the town proper.

The town is located in the municipality of Vesturbyggð. In October 2023, inhabitants voted for the merger of the municipalities, which officially took place in May 2024. The town of Tálknafjörður was formerly named Sveinseyri [ˈsveinsˌeiːrɪ] or Tunga [ˈtʰuŋka, ˈtʰʏŋka]. By road, the distance to Ísafjörður, the largest city in the West Fjords, is 137 km, and 403 km to Reykjavík. This distance can be significantly shortened by the ferry from Brjánslækur [ˈprjaunsˌlaiːkʏr̥] to Stykkishólmur.
