= Westfjords =

Peninsula and region of Iceland

Westfjords Vestfirðir (Icelandic)
- Region
- The Vestfirðir area
- Coordinates: 65°44′15″N 22°10′14″W
- Country: Iceland
- Largest town: Ísafjörður

Area
  - Total: 8,842 km^{2} (3,414 sq mi)

Population (2026)
  - Total: 7,341
  - Density: 0.84/km^{2} (2.2/sq mi)
- Time zone: UTC+00:00 (WET)
  - Summer (DST): (Not Observed)
- ISO 3166 code: IS-4

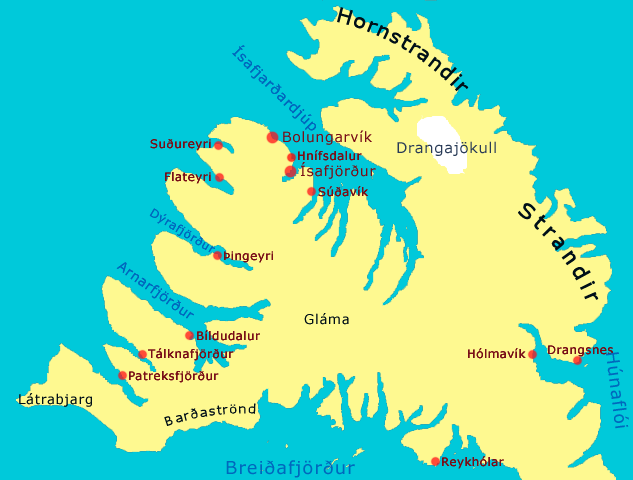
A map of the Westfjords

The Westfjords or West Fjords (Icelandic: Vestfirðir, pronounced [ˈvɛstˌfɪrðɪr̥]) is a large peninsula in northwestern Iceland and an administrative region, the least populous in the country. It lies on the Denmark Strait, facing the east coast of Greenland. It is connected to the rest of Iceland by a seven-kilometre-wide isthmus between Gilsfjörður [ˈcɪlsˌfjœrðʏr̥] and Bitrufjörður [ˈpɪːtrʏˌfjœrðʏr̥]. The Westfjords are mountainous; the coastline is heavily indented by dozens of fjords surrounded by steep hills. These indentations make roads very circuitous and communications by land difficult. In addition, many roads are closed by ice and snow for several months of the year. The Vestfjarðagöng road tunnel from 1996 has improved that situation. The cliffs at Látrabjarg comprise the longest bird cliff in the northern Atlantic Ocean and are at the westernmost point in Iceland. Drangajökull, the only glacier in the region, is located in the north of the peninsula and is the fifth-largest in the country. Westfjords is certified by the EarthCheck Sustainable Destinations program.

== Population ==
The lack of flat lowlands limits agriculture, mostly restricted to low-intensity sheep grazing near the fjords. Good natural harbors in many fjords and their proximity to fishing areas are vital for the local economy. The Westfjords are sparsely populated, even by Icelandic standards; the total population in 2024 was 7,168. The largest settlement is Ísafjörður, with a population of 2,679.

Population decline
Year	Population	% of Iceland's population
1920	13,443	14.24%
1930	13,133	12.09%
1940	13,130	10.80%
1950	11,300	7.83%
1960	10,507	5.86%
1970	10,050	4.91%
1980	10,479	4.53%
1990	9,798	3.80%
2000	8,150	2.86%
2007	7,309	2.32%
2020	7,115	1.95%

=== Main settlements in the Westfjords ===
- Reykhólar
- Bolungarvík
- Brjánslækur [ˈprjaunsˌlaiːkʏr̥]
- Ísafjörður
- Tálknafjörður
- Flateyri
- Suðureyri
- Hnífsdalur
- Súðavík
- Bíldudalur
- Þingeyri
- Patreksfjörður
- Skálanes
- Hólmavík
- Drangsnes

== Climate ==
The box is for Göltur [ˈkɔl̥tʏr̥], at the tip of the peninsula 20 km (12 mi) northwest of Ísafjörður. Westfjords is generally the coldest area at sea level in Iceland, as a result of the East Greenland Current.

Climate data for Göltur
Month	Jan	Feb	Mar	Apr	May	Jun	Jul	Aug	Sep	Oct	Nov	Dec	Year
Record high °C (°F)	10 (50)	10 (50)	11 (52)	11 (52)	17 (63)	18 (64)	19 (66)	18 (64)	15 (59)	15 (59)	13 (55)	11 (52)	19 (66)
Mean daily maximum °C (°F)	1 (33)	2 (35)	3 (37)	4 (40)	7 (44)	9 (49)	11 (51)	11 (51)	7 (45)	5 (41)	4 (40)	2 (35)	6 (42)
Daily mean °C (°F)	−2 (29)	0 (32)	1 (33)	2 (36)	4 (40)	7 (45)	8 (47)	8 (47)	6 (42)	3 (38)	3 (37)	0 (32)	3 (38)
Mean daily minimum °C (°F)	−3 (26)	−2 (29)	−1 (30)	1 (33)	2 (36)	5 (41)	7 (44)	7 (44)	4 (40)	2 (35)	1 (34)	−1 (30)	2 (35)
Record low °C (°F)	−11 (12)	−10 (14)	−13 (9)	−7 (19)	−4 (25)	−2 (28)	2 (36)	1 (34)	−3 (27)	−5 (23)	−9 (16)	−9 (16)	−13 (9)
Average relative humidity (%)	75	77	76	79	77	82	83	81	82	79	80	78	79
Mean daily sunshine hours	6	9.2	12.7	16.6	20.7	23.4	21.5	18.1	13.9	10.3	6.9	4.6	13.7
Source: Weatherbase

== Law ==
In 1615, 32 shipwrecked Basque whalers were killed by locals, after which the magistrate made it law that any Basque person seen in the region should be instantly killed. This law was repealed in May 2015.

== Wildlife ==
The Westfjords are famous for their large Arctic Fox population. The density of Arctic Fox in some parts of Hornstrandir nature reserve (such as Hornvík) is the highest in the world.

In addition, Látrabjarg cliffs in the south-west of the peninsula are the most important seabird nesting site in Iceland, and one of the most important in Europe. The most common birds in the Westfjords are the Arctic tern, northern fulmar, black-legged kittiwake, Atlantic puffin, common guillemot, black guillemot, red-necked phalarope and ducks such as the common eider and harlequin duck.

== Image gallery ==
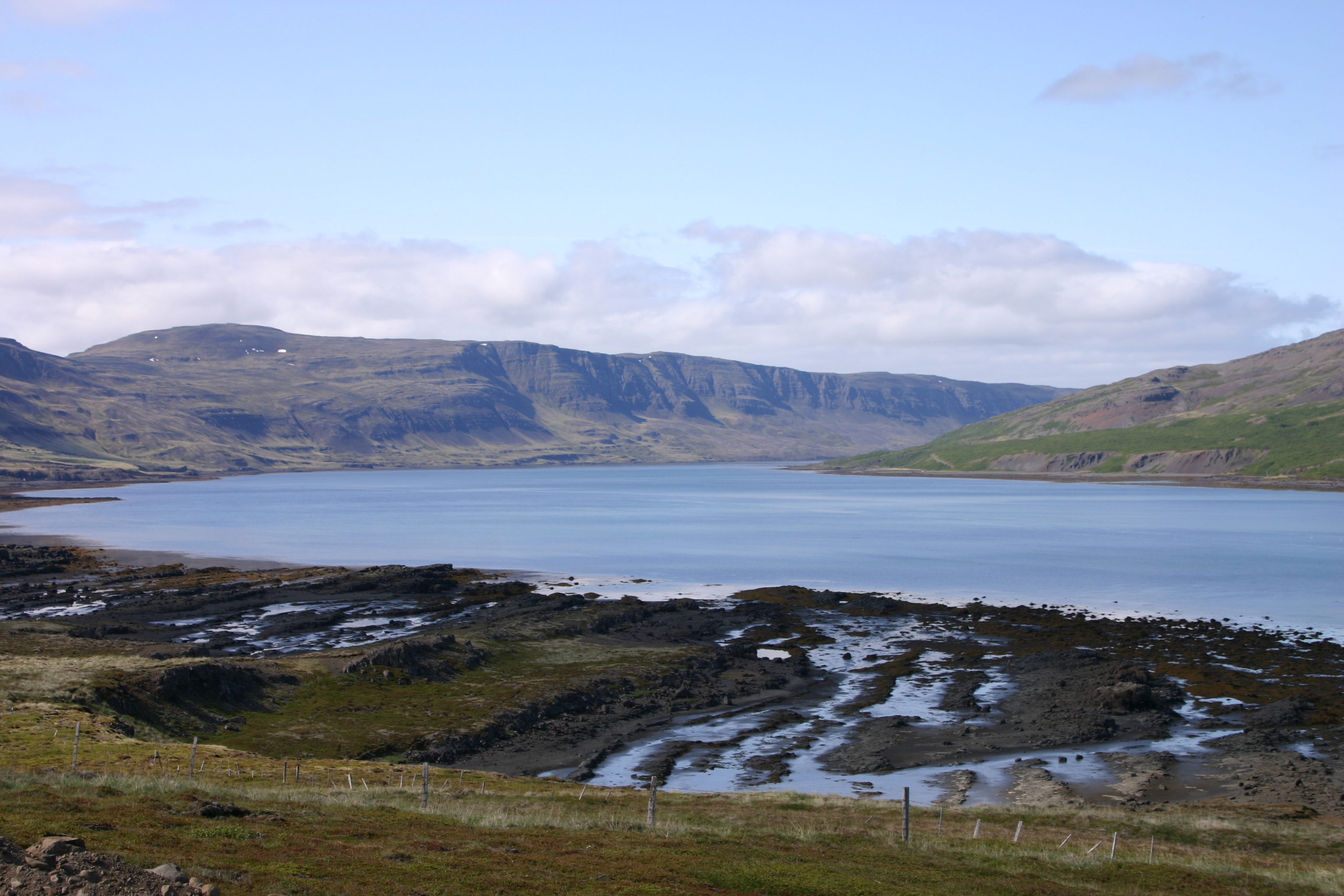
Westfjords

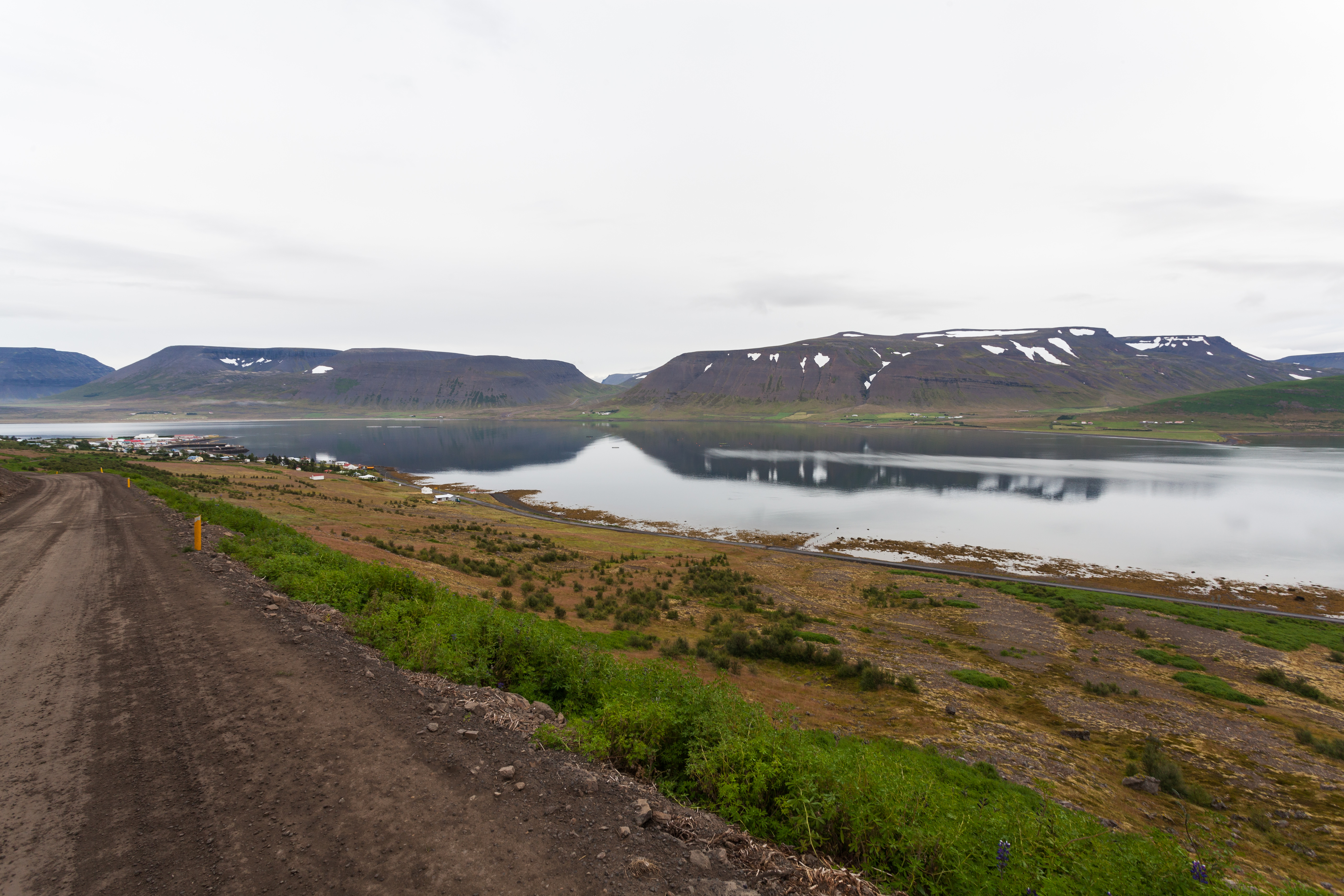
Dýrafjörður

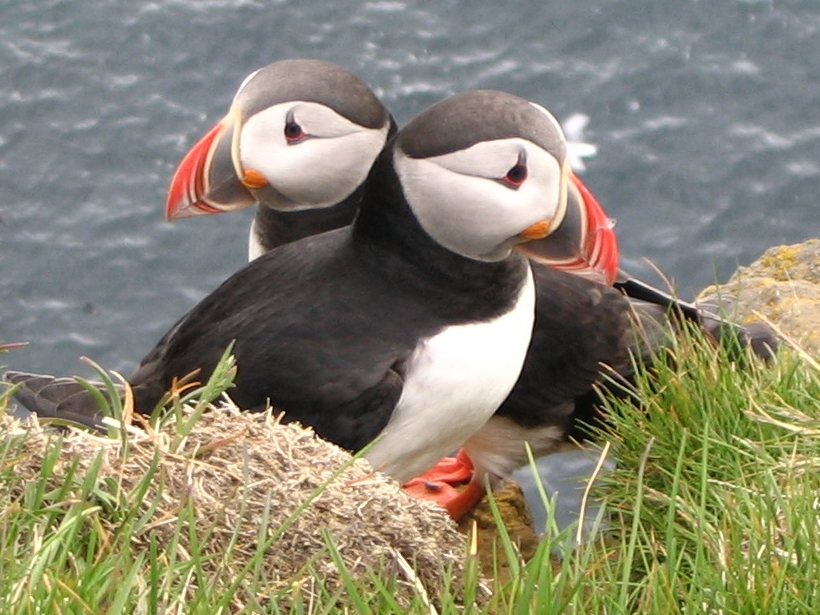
Puffins in Látrabjarg

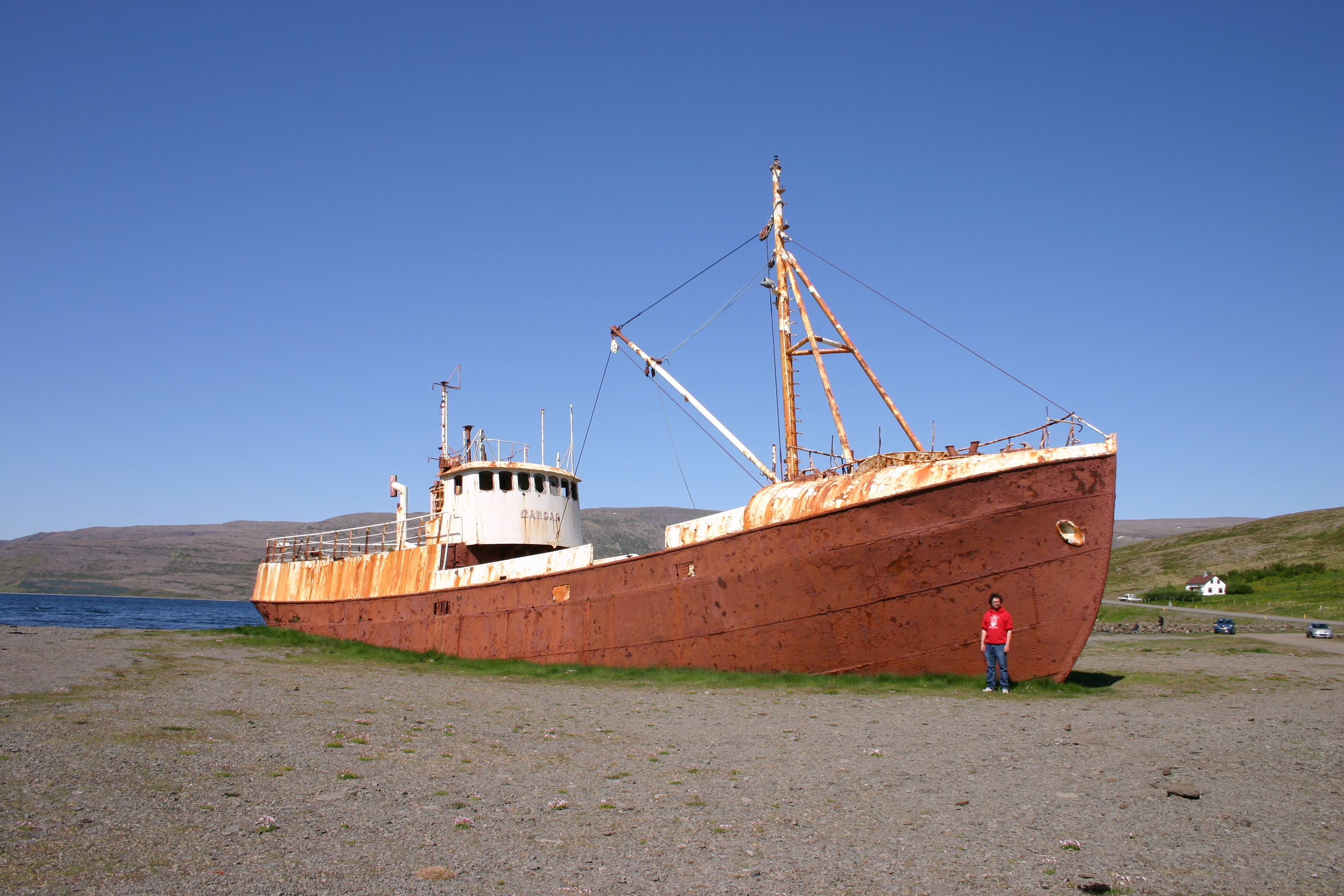
Oldest steel ship in Iceland

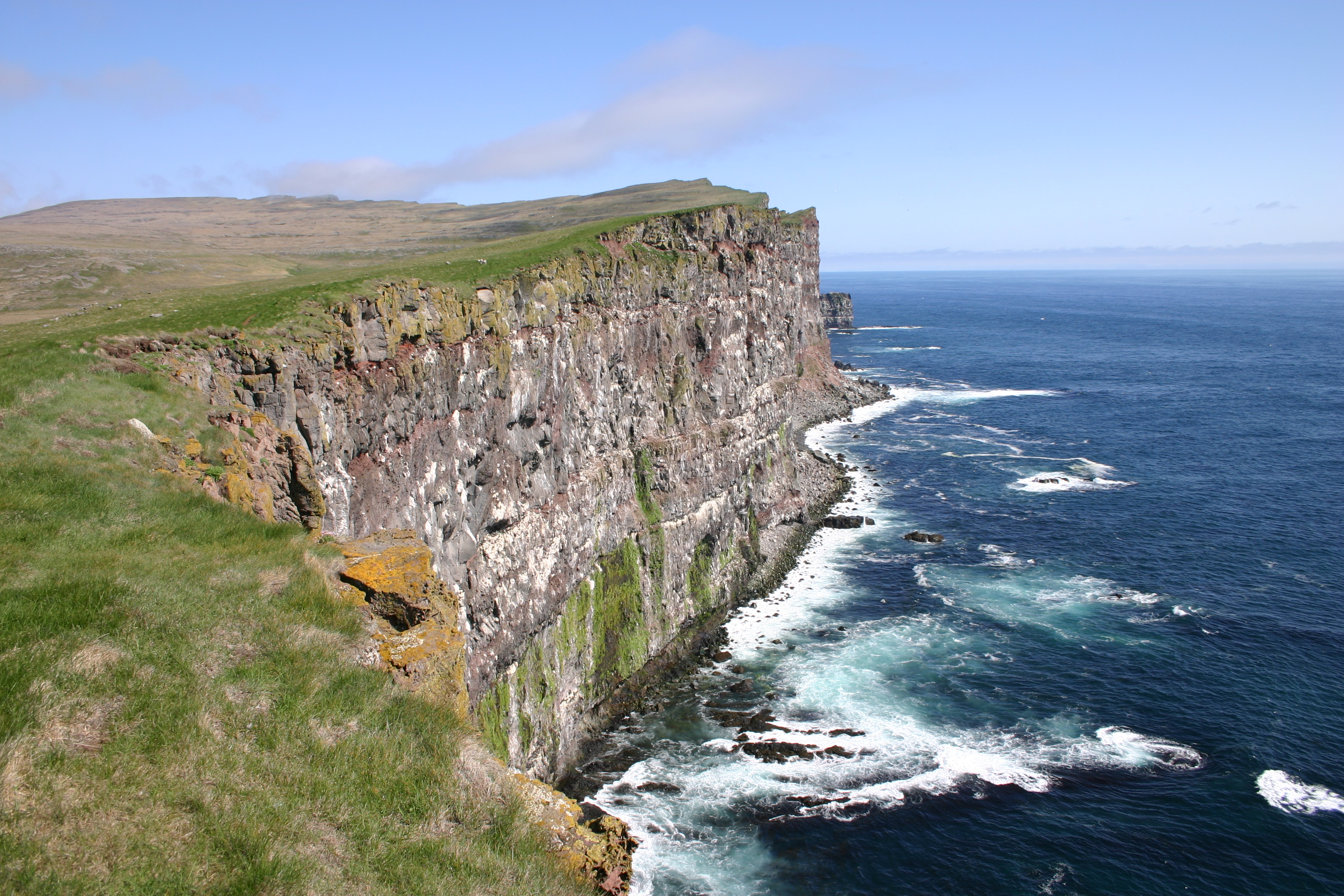
Látrabjarg

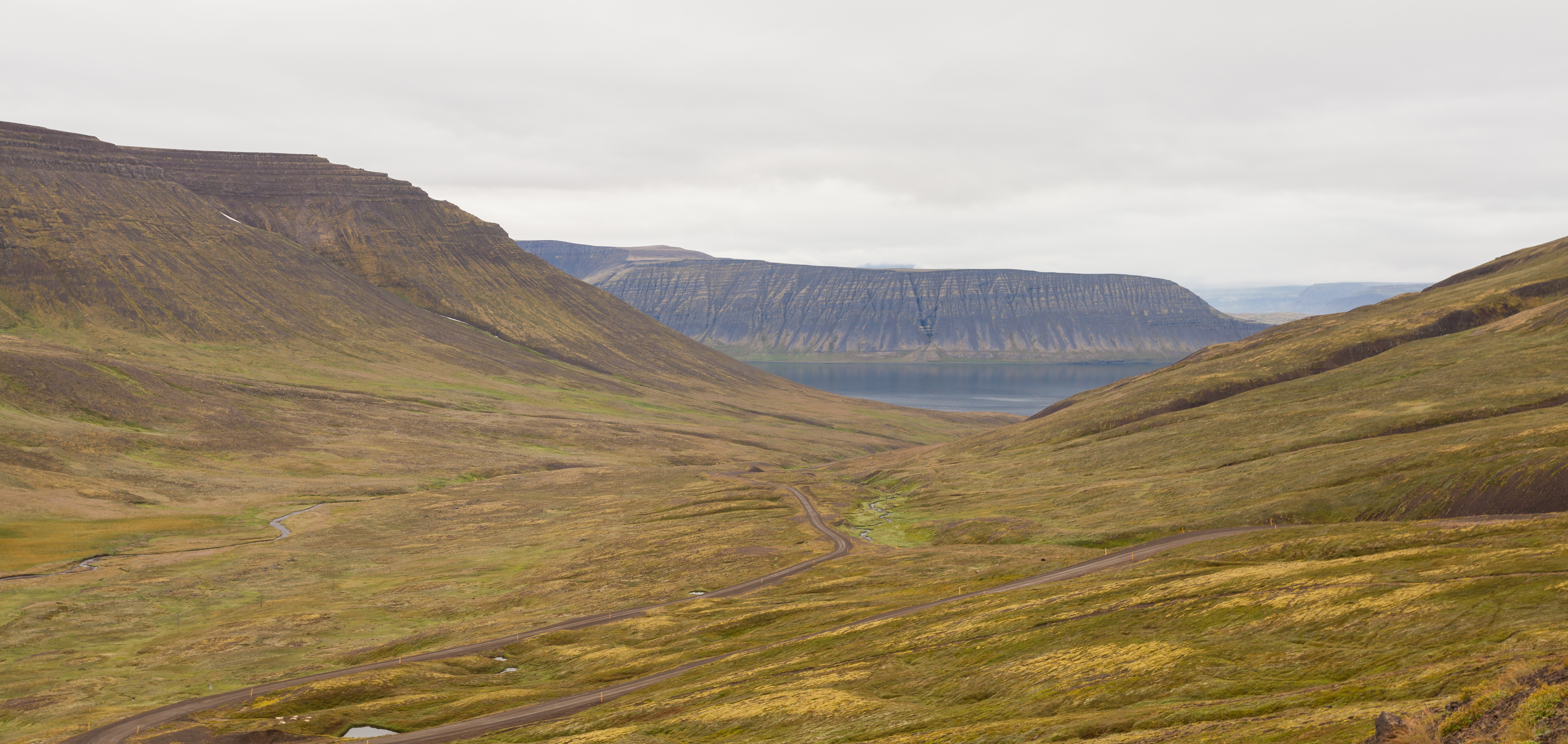
Hrafnseyrarheiði

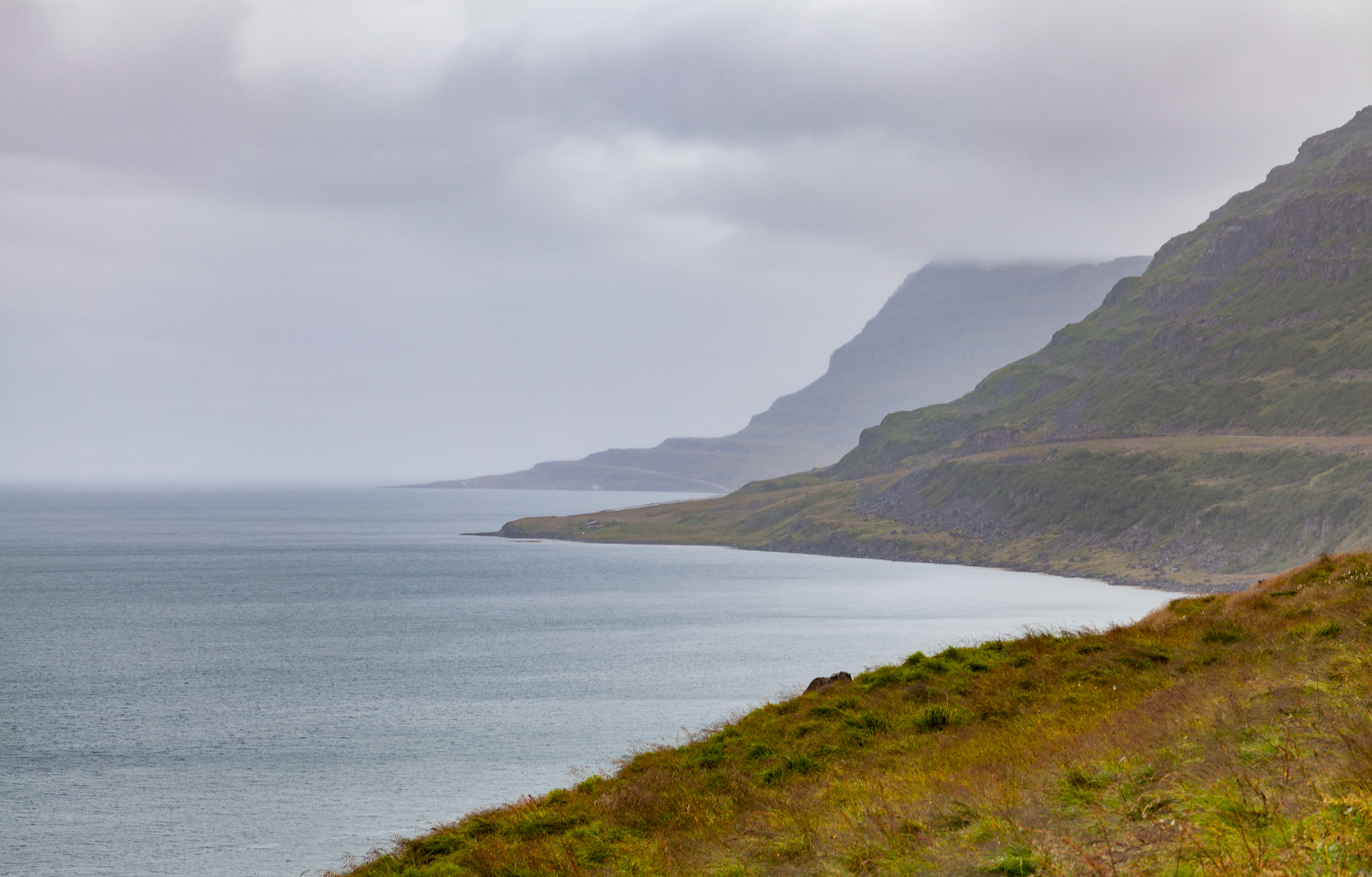
Hvítanes

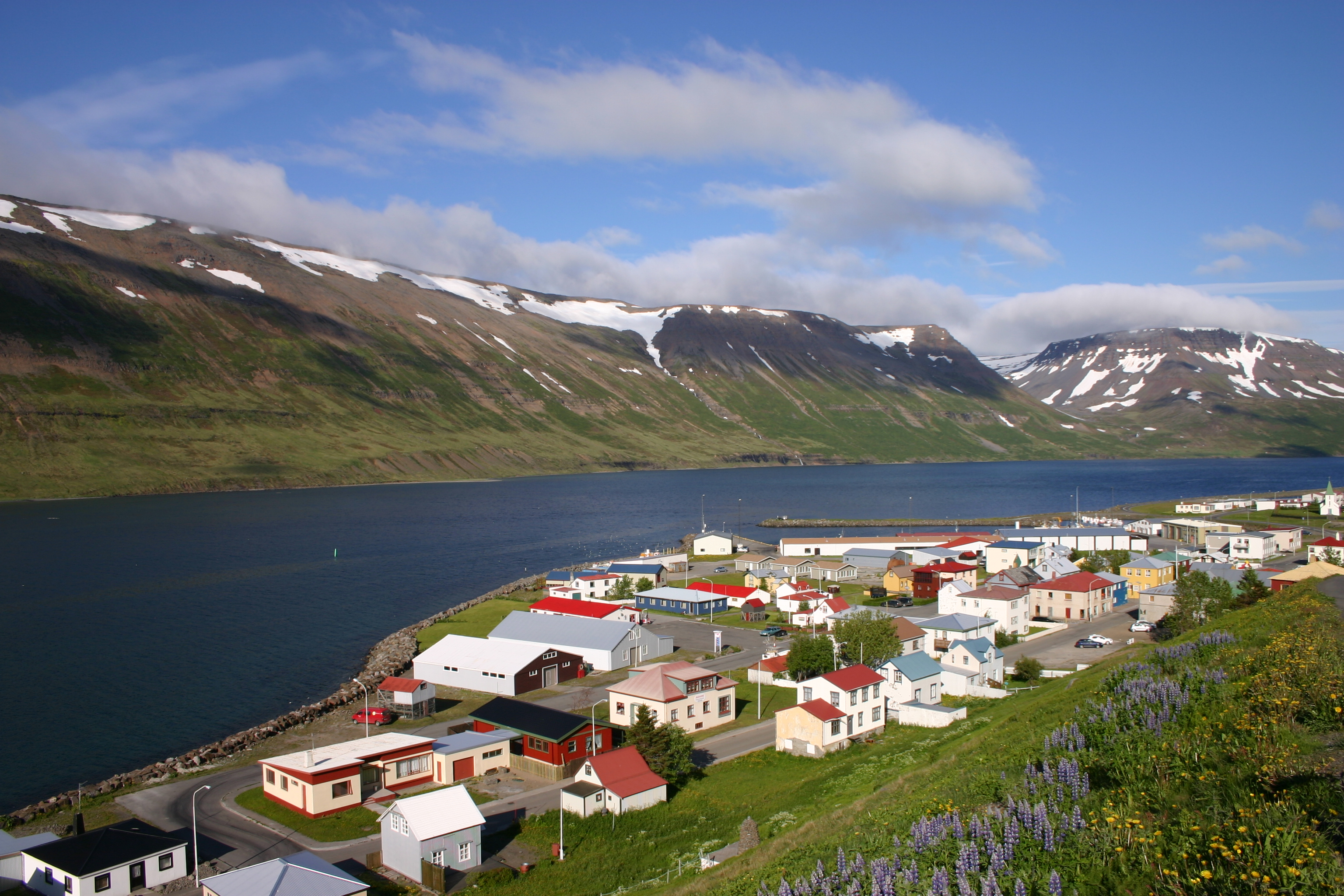
Suðureyri

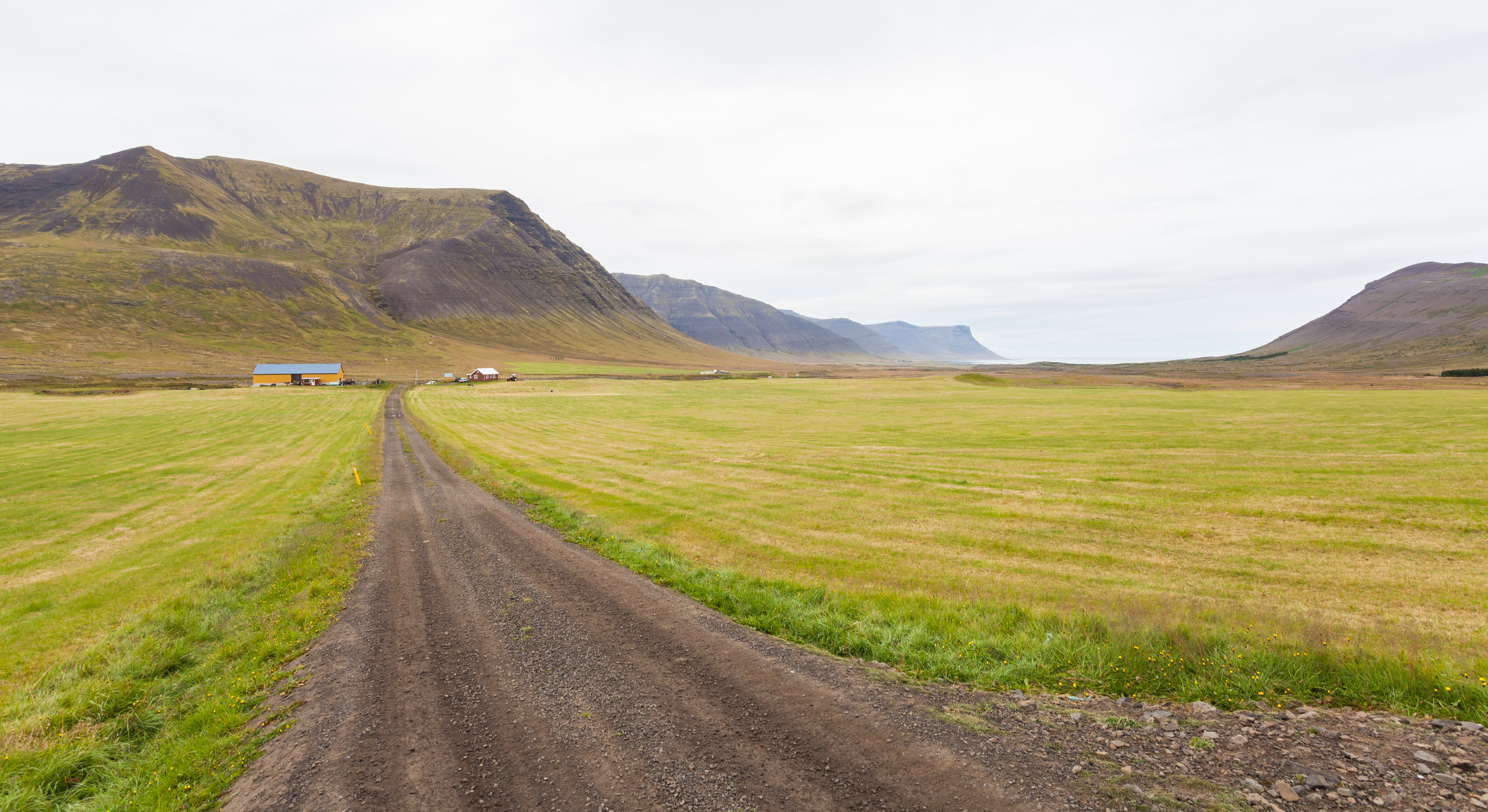
Landscape near Þingeyri

== See also ==
- Barðaströnd
- Bjarkalundur
- Westfjords Heritage Museum
- Regions of Iceland
- Tunnels in Iceland
- Basque–Icelandic pidgin
