= Niceair =

Icelandic virtual airline

IATA	ICAO	Call sign
—	HFM	n/a
- Founded: February 2022; 3 years ago
- Commenced operations: 2 June 2022; 2 years ago
- Ceased operations: April 2023 (suspended); May 2023 (bankruptcy)
- Operating bases: Akureyri Airport
- Fleet size: 1
- Destinations: 3
- Headquarters: Akureyri, Iceland
- Key people: Þorvaldur Lúðvík Sigurjónsson (CEO)
- Website: niceair.is

Niceair was a virtual airline headquartered in Akureyri in northern Iceland, with operations based at Akureyri Airport. The company launched services on 2 June 2022, using a leased Airbus A319. It was forced to suspend all operations and later declared insolvency in May 2023.

== History ==
In February 2022, Niceair was announced as a virtual airline with the intention of bringing tourists to northern Iceland from other parts of Europe, with services planned to launch on 2 June 2022, using a fleet consisting of a single Airbus A319. The company was launched with financial backing from various investors including Samherji and Norlandair. The company additionally had no immediate plans to acquire its own air operator's certificate, instead planning for its flights to be operated by a separate charter airline. During March 2022, the operating airline was revealed to be Hi Fly Malta, and Niceair subsequently began ticket sales for flights.

Following the launch of its first service to London-Stansted on 3 June 2022, the company found it was not allowed to transport passengers on its first return flight from London back to Akureyri, as an air services treaty between Iceland and the United Kingdom that came into effect as part of Brexit did not allow for Hi Fly Malta to operate scheduled services between the two countries on behalf of Niceair. The company subsequently suspended its London Stansted services. This also led to the circumstance that the planned flights to Manchester did not proceed in October 2022 as previously planned.

In March 2023, Niceair called off its proposed service to Düsseldorf from May 2023, planning to inaugurate it in 2024 instead.

The airline suspended operations on 5 April 2023 after their sole aircraft, operated by Hi Fly Malta, was detained by its lessor. Niceair stated a lack of available alternative aircraft as a reason for the forced suspension of all operations. In May 2023, Niceair laid off all remaining staff and announced it would not resume operations in 2023. A few weeks later, the airline filed for insolvency and closed down.

== Destinations ==
As of April 2023, Niceair has offered or planned scheduled services to the following destinations:

Country/territory	City/region	Airport	Start date	End date	Notes	Refs
Denmark	Copenhagen	Copenhagen Airport	2 June 2022	suspended		
Iceland	Akureyri	Akureyri Airport	2 June 2022	suspended	Base	
Spain	Tenerife	Tenerife South Airport	8 June 2022	suspended	Seasonal	
United Kingdom	London	London Stansted Airport	3 June 2022	3 June 2022	Terminated	

== Fleet ==
As of June 2022, Niceair had chartered the following aircraft under its brand:

Niceair fleet
Aircraft	In service	Orders	Passengers	Notes
Airbus A319-100	1	—	150	Leased from Hi Fly Malta
Total	1	—		

== See also ==
- List of defunct airlines of Iceland
