= VPN (disambiguation) =

VPN, or virtual private network, is an extension of a private network across a public one.

- VPN service

VPN may also refer to:

- Public Against Violence (Slovak: Verejnosť proti násiliu), a political party in Czechoslovakia
- Ventral posterior nucleus, the somato-sensory relay nucleus in thalamus of the brain
- Vickers pyramid number (HV), a rating of the Vickers hardness test
- Vietnam People's Navy, a part of the Vietnam People's Army
- Virtual page number, stored in a page table
- Vopnafjörður Airport, Iceland (IATA code: VPN)
