= Healthcare in Iceland =

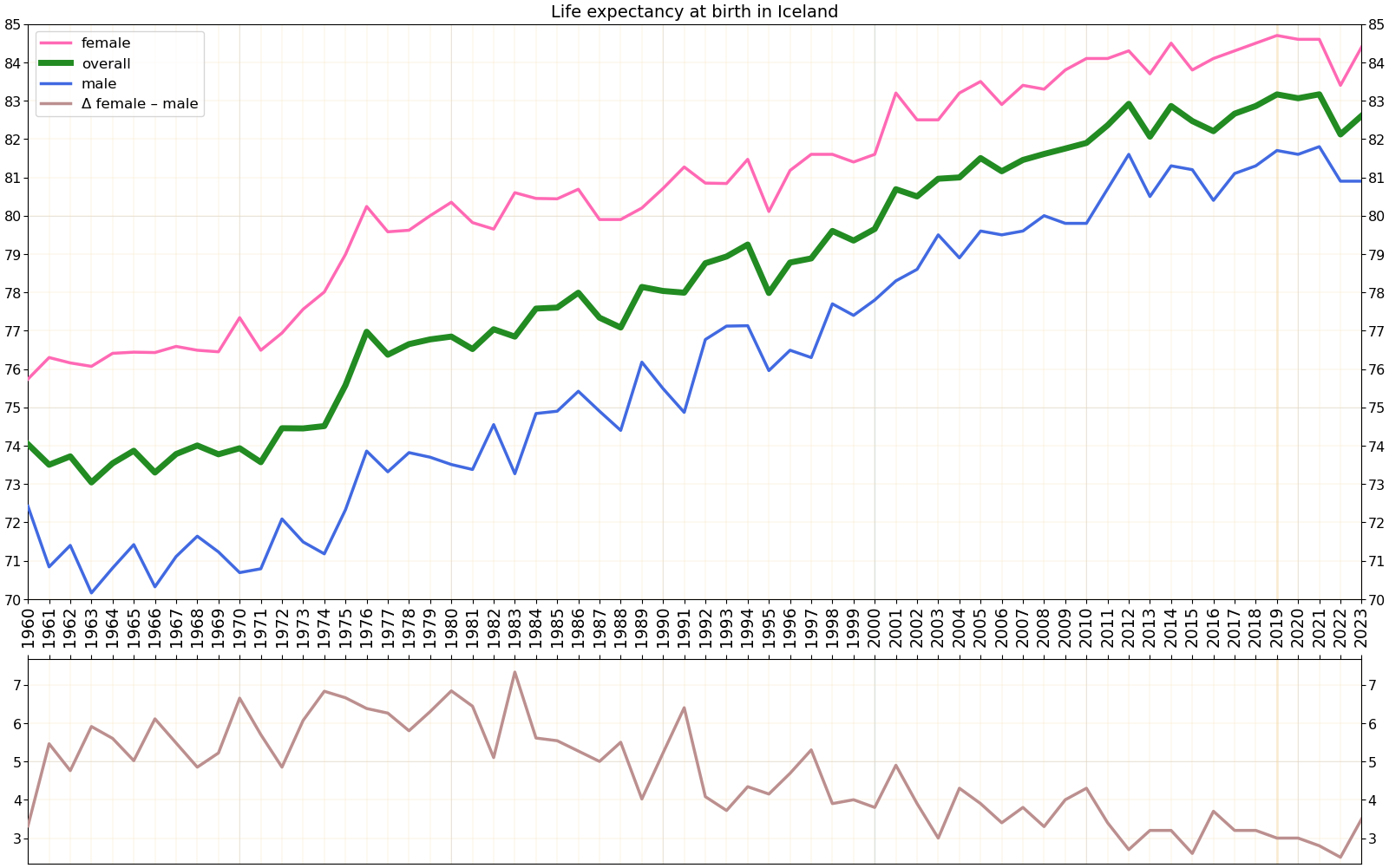
Life expectancy development in Iceland by gender

Iceland has a state-centred, publicly funded universal healthcare system and health insurance that covers the whole population. The number of private providers in Iceland has increased. The healthcare system is largely paid for by taxes (84%) and to some extent by service fees (16%) and is administered by the Ministry of Health. A considerable portion of government spending is assigned to healthcare. There is almost no private health insurance in Iceland and no private hospitals. In very limited cases (e.g. skin diseases), access to a private provider can be reimbursement for services provided that the conditions are met.

== Financing and funding ==
The healthcare system in Iceland is financed with the taxes raised by the central government. This is affected by the Nordic welfare state model, in which public service is heavily funded through taxation to support the general public, in order for the population to have equal access to health care and welfare system. Although local authorities have limited influence over the national health care system, Iceland has adapted to similar structures to other Nordic countries, implementing decentralized structure by dividing the country into seven local health care regions. The health care regions were implemented to promote cooperations between institutions, and to provide quality care through regional provisions. However, this has not affected the financial responsibility of the central government. Although healthcare is to a great extent funded through taxation, some out-of-pocket expenses are still required, such as service fees, of which some groups are exempted, for example children, disabled people and elderly people

As of 2018, out-of-pocket expenditure is at 16% of total healthcare expenditure, similar to levels of 2007 and 2008 but significantly lower than it was both at 2001 (19.5%) and 2021 (18.5%). The general population has shown overwhelming support for universal healthcare and governmental funding. Through a research survey conducted in 2013 focused on Icelandic adults, in which 94% of the respondents want the government to spend more on public health care, and 81% of the respondents prefer and supports primary health care to be provided by the government.

According to a 2017 study published in The Lancet, the Icelandic healthcare system has the world's second best Healthcare Access and Quality Index, a composite measure collected as a part of the Global Burden of Disease Study.

== Healthcare services ==
=== Primary care ===
Health centers that provide primary health care are located throughout the country, while some runs along smaller institutes and hospitals, all are funded and administered by central government. In accordance with the 1973 Health Care Act, which established universal primary health care and increase the number of health personnel and institutes in the country, all patients are required to register and access through a primary care center and a general practitioner of their choice. Specialist services are provided mainly by general practitioners, privately operated or publicly funded.

=== Secondary care ===
There are a total of 6 regional hospitals and 16 health institutions throughout the country, funded through fixed global budgets. The main hospital is located in Reykjavik. Most hospital professionals and doctors are salaried employees, and are paid through hospital budgets. Doctors can also see private patients outside of the hospitals if they receive 80 percent or less.

=== Long-term care ===
Long-term care can be accessed through institutions or at home. This includes personal assistance and domestic care, including nursing homes or child care. These services are provided by either private institutes or public services, and are funded through national budgets. Part-time and home-based child care are payable but subsidized, priority is given to special interest groups.

== Medical training ==
Iceland does not have its own specialist medical training system, so Icelandic doctors typically spend 8 or 10 years working abroad before returning to the country. They often use the relationship established in training for ongoing support.

== Healthcare districts ==
Name (English)	Name (Icelandic)	Primary care	Secondary and tertiary care
Capital Region Healthcare District	Heilbrigðisumdæmi höfuðborgarsvæðisins	Heilsugæsla höfuðborgarsvæðisins	Landspítali
Western Region Healthcare District	Heilbrigðisumdæmi Vesturlands	Heilbrigðisstofnun Vesturlands	
Westfjords Healthcare District	Heilbrigðisumdæmi Vestfjarða	Heilbrigðisstofnun Vestfjarða	
Northern Healthcare District	Heilbrigðisumdæmi Norðurlands	Heilbrigðisstofnun Norðurlands	Sjúkrahúsið á Akureyri and Heilbrigðisstofnun Norðurlands
Eastern Region Healthcare District	Heilbrigðisumdæmi Austurlands	Heilbrigðisstofnun Austurlands	
Southern Region Healthcare District	Heilbrigðisumdæmi Suðurlands	Heilbrigðisstofnun Suðurlands	
Southern Peninsula Healthcare District	Heilbrigðisumdæmi Suðurnesja	Heilbrigðisstofnun Suðurnesja	

== See also ==
- Emergency medical services in Iceland
- Health in Iceland
