= Vestmannaeyjar Airport =

Vestmannaeyjar Airport Vestmannaeyjaflugvöllur
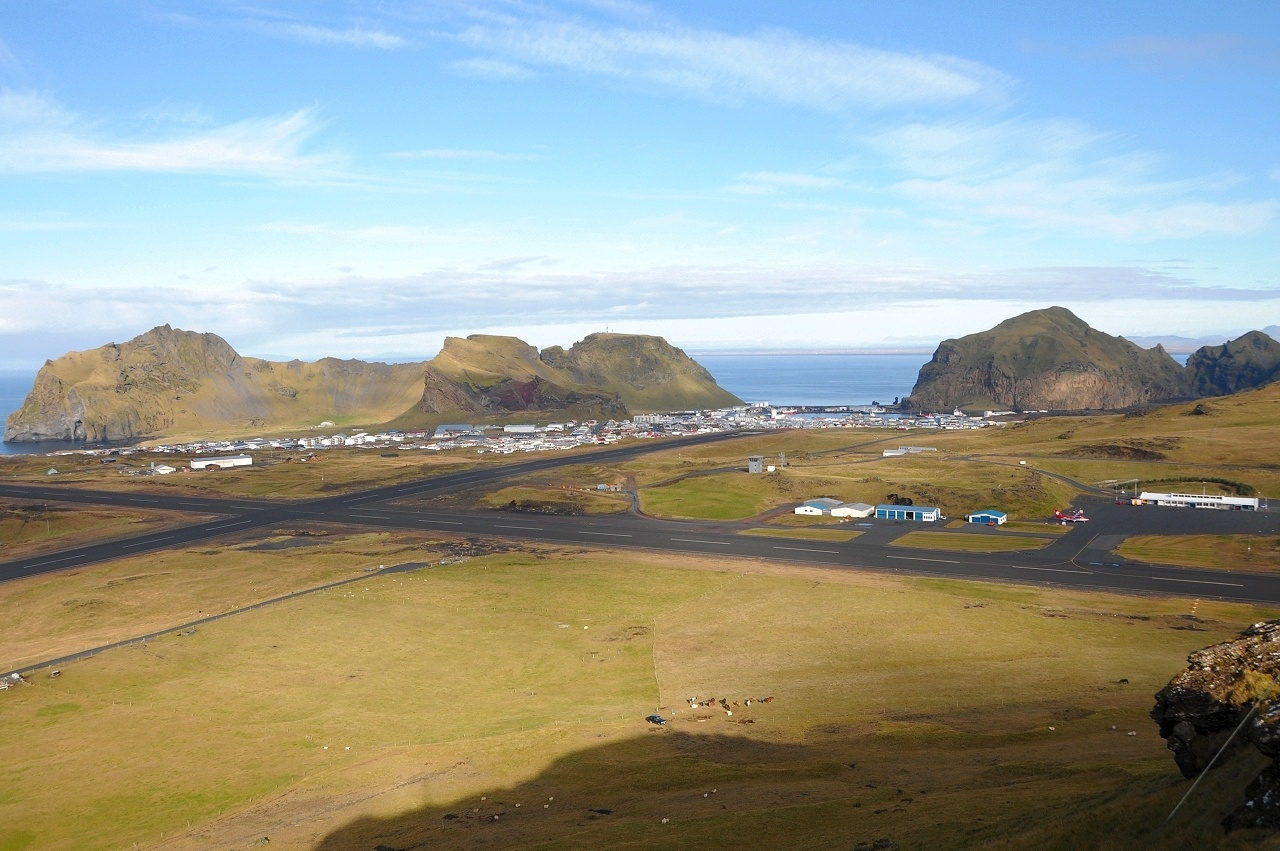
- IATA: VEY; ICAO: BIVM

Summary
- Airport type: Public
- Operator: ISAVIA
- Serves: Vestmannaeyjar, Iceland
- Location: Heimaey
- Elevation AMSL: 326 ft (99 m)
- Coordinates: 63°25′30″N 020°16′45″W

Map
- Location of Airport in Iceland

Runways
| Direction | Length | | Surface |
| Direction | m | ft | Surface |
|---|---|---|---|
| 03/21 | 1,160 | 3,806 | Asphalt |
| 12/30 | 1,199 | 3,934 | Asphalt |

Statistics (2016)
- Passengers: 19,107
- Source: AIP Iceland

Vestmannaeyjar Airport (Icelandic: Vestmannaeyjaflugvöllur [ˈvɛstˌmanːaˌeiːjaˌflʏɣˌvœtlʏr̥]; IATA: VEY, ICAO: BIVM) is a two-runway airport on the island of Heimaey, in Vestmannaeyjar (Westman Islands), a small archipelago off the south coast of Iceland.

The airport services seasonal, charter and medical flights as well as general aviation. Seasonal scheduled air service is provided during the winter months.

== Operations ==
As of 2025, there are seasonal winter scheduled passenger flights to Vestmannaeyjar Airport to Reykjavík. The airport also services general aviation, medivac and charter flights.

Icelandair has regularly offered charter flights during the Þjóðhátið festival held on the island during a weekend in August.

== History ==
The airport was opened on 13 November 1946 with a 60 x 800 m single runway (13/31). It is the first airport that the Icelandic government constructed without foreign or military assistance. In 1953 the first control tower was constructed. The runway was lengthened to 900 m by 1973. In 1971, the second runway, 04/22, began construction. There was a lack of fill material on the island which made construction slow.

During Eldfell's volcanic eruption in 1973, Vestmannaeyjar Airport served as an evacuation point for elderly and patients from the hospital who could not evacuate by boat. After the eruption was over, the tephra provided suitable materials to extend the runways to 1,300 m and 1,100 m. A new control tower was constructed in 1978 and a new terminal was opened in 1980.

In 1990 the runways were paved and a new hangar added in 1995. In the year 2000, the airport terminal was expanded and renovated.

Air Iceland flew multiple daily flights to Reykjavík Airport, using Bombardier Dash 8-200s in its last years of operations at Vestmannaeyjar Airport. There were also private flights to the nearest point on mainland Iceland at Bakki Airport, taking approximately 7 minutes (depending on the weather). The scheduled flights to Reykjavík Airport take around 20 minutes.

After the opening of the Landeyjahöfn harbour in July 2010, which shortened the sailing time to the Icelandic mainland to 30 minutes (previously 3 hours), demand for regular passenger flights was not as prevalent as before. As a result, Air Iceland ended all scheduled activity on 3 August 2010. Eagle Air then became the main airline serving the airport, using smaller aircraft.

Eagle Air suspended regular flights to Vestmannaeyjar in September 2020, citing a lack of commercial viability. From 2021, intermittent funding agreements with the Ministry of Infrastructure subsidising thrice-weekly flights were available during the periods:

- January 2021 to August 2021, with Air Iceland Connect.
- December 2022 to April 2023, with Eagle Air.
- 15 December 2023 to 1 April 2024, with Eagle Air.

In early 2024, the Icelandic government committed to providing winter seasonal service to the airport. After the bankruptcy of Eagle Air, in October 2024, Mýflug Air secured a government contract to run winter seasonal flights to Vestmannaeyjar Airport running from December to March for the period 2024-2027. Then in April 2025, Mýflug relinquished its remaining scheduled flights, including to Vestmannaeyjar, with Norlandair acquiring the routes.

== Airlines and destinations ==
The following airlines offer winter seasonal scheduled and charter flights:

| Airlines | Destinations |
|---|---|
| Norlandair | Seasonal: Reykjavík |

== Statistics ==
=== Passengers and movements ===
| | Number of passengers (Note: Number of passengers including domestic, international and transit.) | Number of movements (Note: Number of movements represents total takeoffs and landings during that year.) |
|---|---|---|
| 2003 | 45,156 | 13,244 |
| 2004 | 47,157 | 13,762 |
| 2005 | 50,490 | 13,526 |
| 2006 | 47,523 | 13,714 |
| 2007 | 48,882 | 13,200 |
| 2008 | 52,189 | 14,599 |
| 2009 | 55,382 | 11,034 |
| 2010 | 26,300 | 5,142 |
| 2011 | 20,430 | 4,022 |
| 2012 | 19,242 | 4,136 |
| 2013 | 17,655 | 4,159 |
| 2014 | 19,412 | 4,900 |
| 2015 | 19,637 | 4,718 |
| 2016 | 19,107 | 4,586 |
| 2017 | 17,395 | 4,817 |
| 2018 | 16,803 | 4,292 |
| 2019 | 11,690 | 3,484 |
| 2020 | 3,691 | 2,432 |
| 2021 | 3,532 | 1,605 |
