= Eagle Air (Iceland) =

Icelandic airline

Eagle Air Iceland
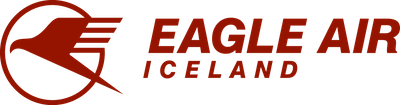
IATA	ICAO	Call sign
FEI	FEI	ARCTIC EAGLE
- Founded: 1970; 56 years ago
- Ceased operations: August 2024
- Hubs: Reykjavik Airport
- Fleet size: 6
- Destinations: 3
- Headquarters: Reykjavik Airport, Iceland
- Key people: Hörður Guðmundsson, Jónína Guðmundsdóttir
- Website: eagleair.is (Website has now been hacked to promote a casino)

Eagle Air (Icelandic name: Flugfélagið Ernir [ˈflʏɣˌfjɛːˌlaijɪð ˈɛ(r)tnɪr̥]) was an Icelandic airline. It was based at Reykjavík Airport and offered domestic flights, charter services, and adventure tours in Iceland.

== History ==
Eagle Air was founded in 1970 by Hörður Guðmundsson and his family as a transportation and security link in the Westfjords, one of the most remote parts of Iceland. The airline's initial focus was on ambulance and mail services. Propeller-driven aircraft operated by Eagle Air included the Helio Courier, Britten-Norman Islander, Piper Aztec, Piper Chieftain, Cessna Titan, de Havilland Canada DHC-6-300 Twin Otter, Cessna 206 and Cessna 185. Eagle Air also had a domestic charter flight component, which moved into the international arena in the early 1980s. Eagle Air flew charters to airports in Iceland, Greenland, Scandinavia and Europe.

In the early 1990s, Eagle Air accepted key assignments from the International Red Cross to operate in Kenya, Sudan, Mozambique and Angola, delivering aid supplies to civil war stricken regions.

In 1995, Eagle Air moved its headquarters from Ísafjörður to Reykjavík after most of its airmail contracts were discontinued due to the opening of the Vestfjarðagöng tunnel. It later sold off most of its airplanes and turned in its air operator's certificate (AOC) but kept one plane along with other assets. The company was restarted in Reykjavík in 2003. In 2006 it reapplied for an AOC took over service to destinations where Air Iceland stopped flying. It operated scheduled services to Gjögur, Bíldudalur, Höfn, and Sauðárkrókur, and in August 2010 to Vestmannaeyjar (Westman Islands). In its last year of operation its only scheduled service was to Höfn.

On 27 February 2018, Birna Borg Gunnarsdóttir, the granddaughter of founder Hörður Guðmundsson, became the first female pilot in the airlines history.

In 2018, the airline purchased a 32-seat Dornier 328 airliner.

In January 2023, the airline Mýflug, together with another investors, bought a 77.1 percent stake in Eagle Air. In October 2024, the airline was declared bankrupt. Mýflug took over its only scheduled service to Höfn.

== Destinations ==
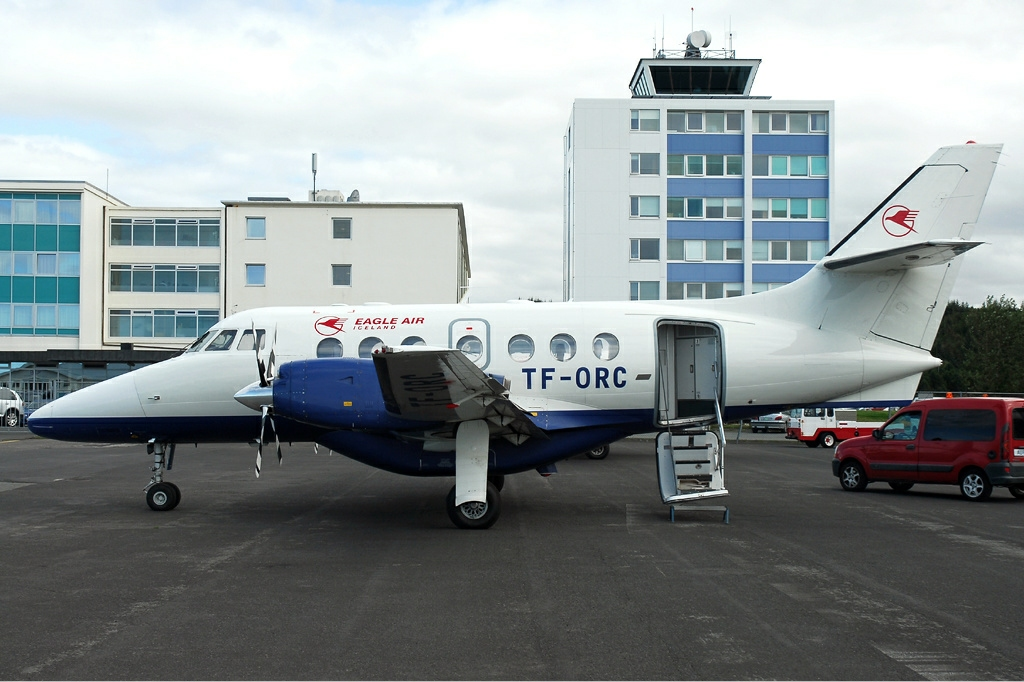
Eagle Air British Aerospace BAe-3212 Jetstream Super 31 at Reykjavik Airport

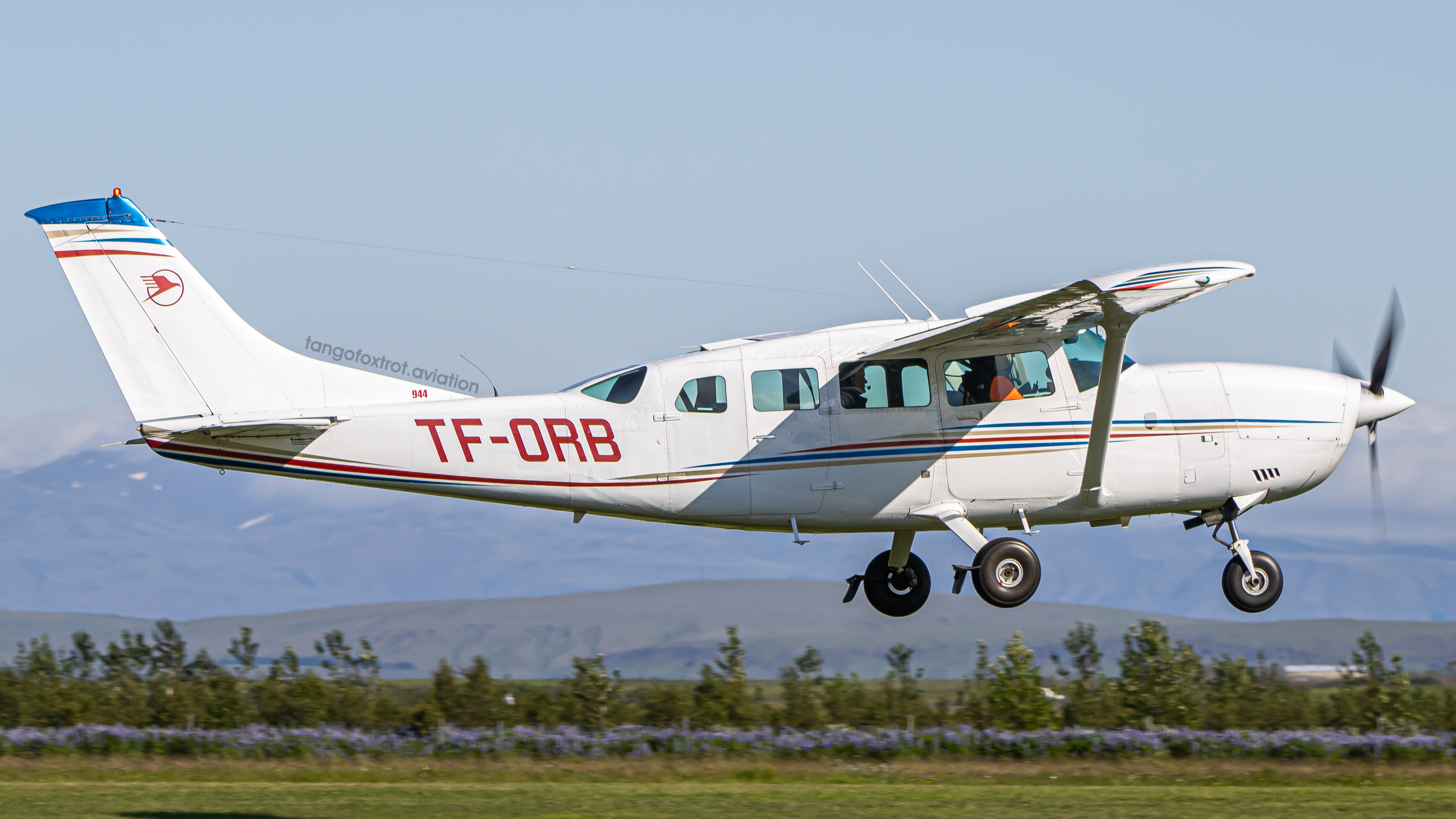
An Eagle Air Iceland Cessna 207A Stationair, landing at Hella Airport after a sightseeing flight during Hella Airshow; Allt Sem Flýgur (e. All That Flies)

From Reykjavík Airport (RKV) to:

=== Former destinations ===
- Bíldudalur Airport (BIU)
- Gjögur Airport (GJR)
- Holt Airport (FLI)
- Hornafjörður Airport (HFN) in Höfn
- Húsavík Airport (HZK)
- Ísafjörður Airport (IFJ)
- Patreksfjörður Airport (PFJ)
- Sauðárkrókur Airport (SAK)
- Suðureyri Airport (SUY)
- Þingeyri Airport
- Vestmannaeyjar Airport (VEY)

== Air charter services ==
=== Ambulance flights ===
Eagle Air had decades of experience in ambulance flights, and flew aircraft with pressurised cabins that can fly above weather for patient comfort. Oxygen and oxygen masks were on board, and a doctor and/or medical crew could be arranged if requested.

=== Freight ===
Eagle Air operated freight flights to any location in Iceland, overseas or at sea.

=== Aerial photography ===
Eagle Air had aircraft which are well suited for aerial photography, livestock inventory, and other similar projects.

== Fleet ==
Before ceasing operations, Eagle Air operated the following aircraft:

- British Aerospace Jetstream 32: TF-ORA, TF-ORC, TF-ORG twin engine turboprop aircraft
- British Aerospace Jetstream 31: TF-ORD
- Cessna 207A Stationair 8: TF-ORB - single engine piston aircraft
- Dornier 328: TF-ORI - twin engine turboprop for 32 passengers

== Accidents and incidents ==
- On 5 April 1986, an Eagle Air Piper PA-23-250 Aztec with registration TF-ORM got caught in a downdraft and crashed in Ljósufjöll in Snæfellsnes, killing four of the six people on board.
- On 11 January 1987, an Eagle Air Piper Chieftain with registration TF-ORN, crashed in the ocean outside of Skutulsfjörður while on approach to Ísafjörður Airport, in bad weather, killing the pilot.
