= Emergency medical services in Iceland =

Emergency medical services in Iceland include the provision of ambulance service. They provide all emergency ambulance service for a population of in excess of 320,000 people in one of the most sparsely settled countries in Europe. The system is government-funded for the first 85 percent of cost, with 15 percent being charged to the individual as a deterrent fee. All services in Iceland are provided by the Icelandic Red Cross, with individual ambulances often co-located with local fire brigades.

== Organization ==
=== Land ambulance ===
There are currently approximately 77 operational land ambulances in Iceland. These are distributed across almost all communities, usually at fire stations. They are owned and equipped by the Icelandic Red Cross, but are crewed by fire service personnel. In larger centres, such as Reykjavík, the ambulances are staffed by full-time, paid Emergency medical technicians. In smaller centres, EMTs may be part-time, or even on-call from home in some cases. All ambulance personnel are either the equivalent of EMT-B or EMT-I. Staffing of ambulances is normally 2 people, with two EMT-Bs, or, where available, an EMT-B and an EMT-I. Paramedics are usually found only in Reykjavík, which operates a single, Advanced Life Support ambulance with a crew of three. Ambulances are organized according to the country's multiple Health Service Districts, but are centrally dispatched. At 2014, the ambulances were converted Mercedes vans.

Land Ambulance in Iceland

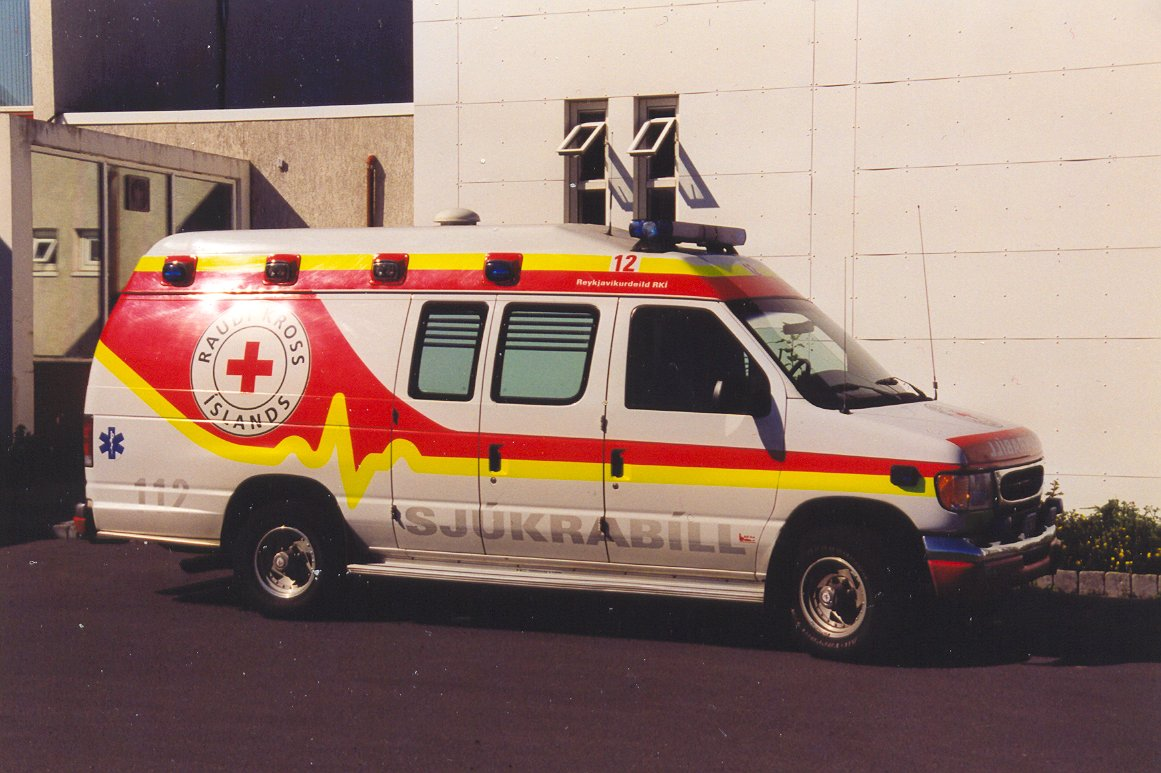
Reykjavík

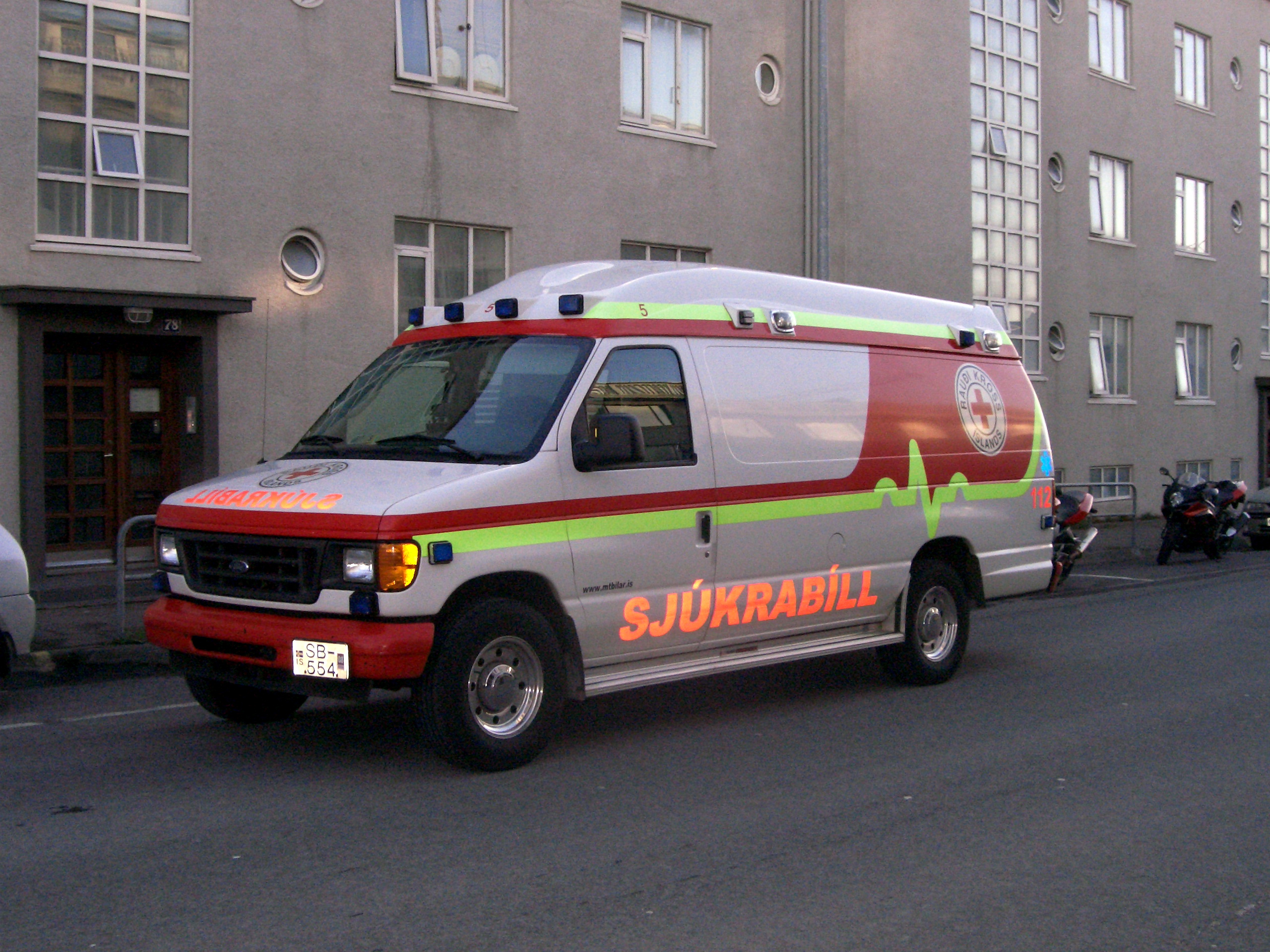
All service provided by Red Cross

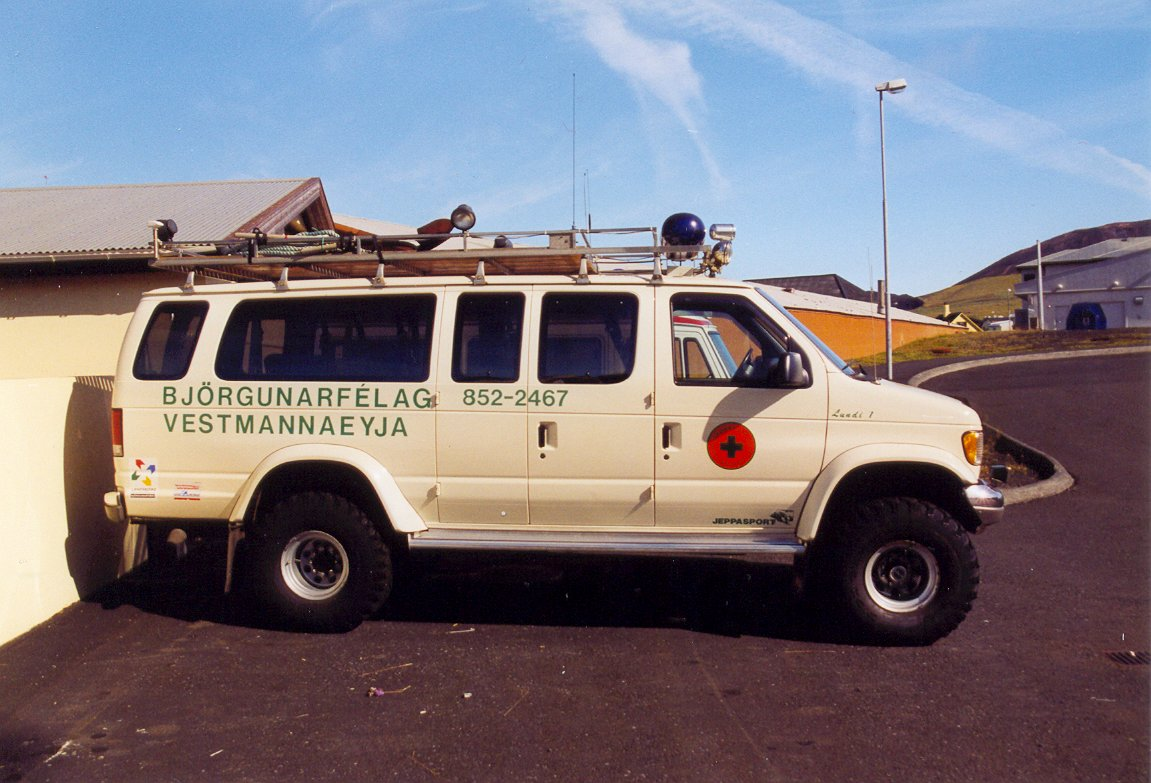
Rural Ambulance/Rescue Vehicle

=== Air ambulance ===
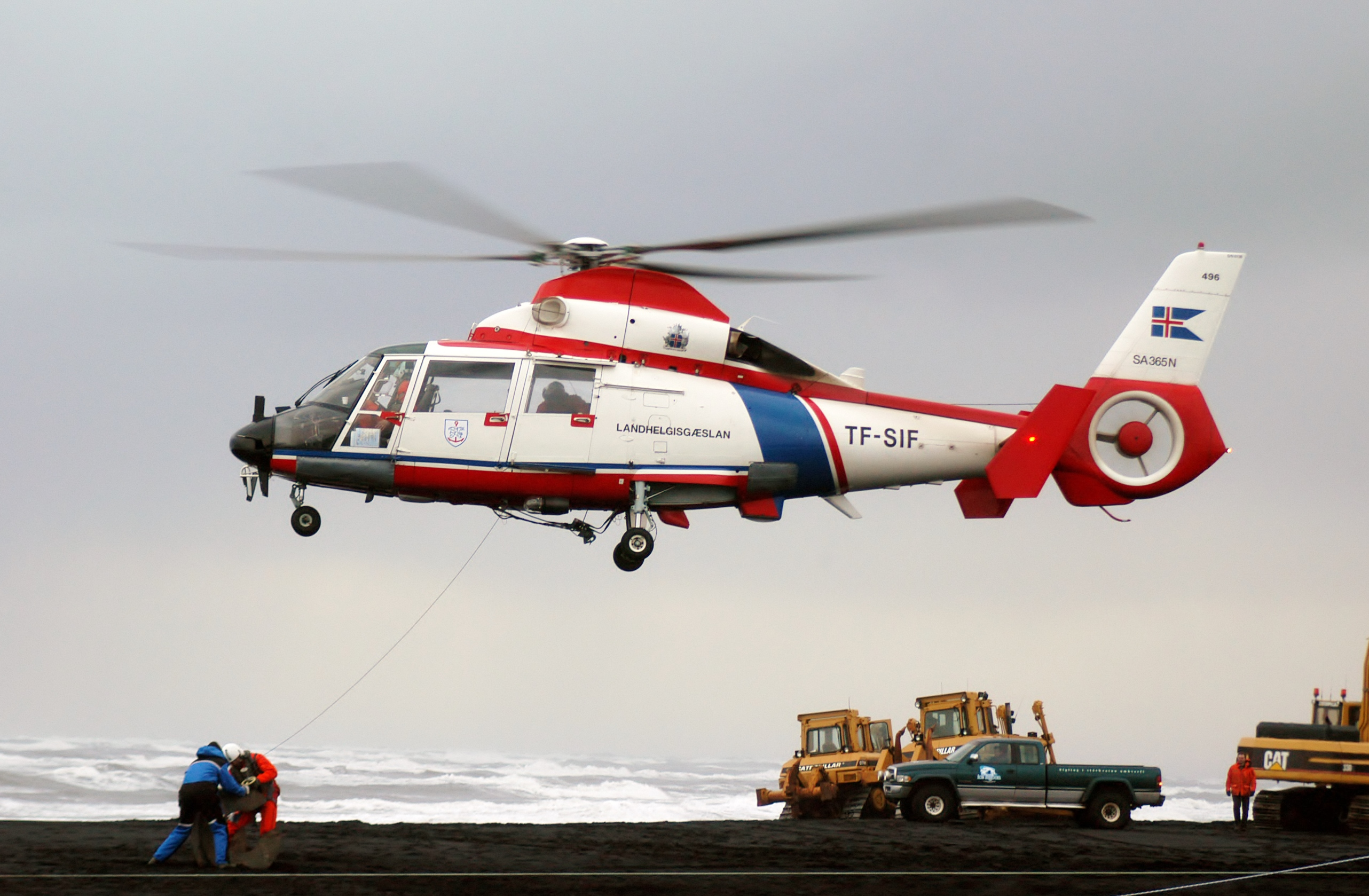
Icelandic Coast Guard Air Ambulance

Because of the sparse population, bad weather, and large numbers of airports, most air ambulance service in Iceland is accomplished using fixed-wing aircraft. The government of Iceland has contracted out this service since 2001. The type of aircraft normally used is a Beechcraft Super King Air 200 operated by the airline Mýflug (Myflug Air). Mýflug has one dedicated air ambulance in Iceland, based at Akureyri, the site of the country's second largest hospital. There are normally 2 aircraft available (one dedicated, one as a charter), with a third charter aircraft being provided during the winter months. When weather conditions or other circumstances make fixed-wing inappropriate, the system has access to three helicopters (Aerospatiale Dauphin or Super Puma) operated by the Icelandic Coast Guard, and based at Reykjavík. On medical missions, Coast Guard helicopters are normally staffed by physicians. Iceland's Air Ambulance system responds to approximately 450 fixed-wing calls per year, and an additional 130-160 helicopter calls per year.

=== Model of care ===
An attempt to describe the model of care used quickly becomes complex. At the ALS end of the spectrum, the model closely resembles the German version of the Franco-German model, with paramedics working with and under the direction of a physician. This represents, however, only the 5 percent of EMS personnel in the entire country who are paramedics, and only a single ambulance, out of 77 units in service. For the balance, the model much more closely resembles the Anglo-American model, with EMTs making their treatment decisions based upon local guidelines, albeit at a basic life support level, or at best, with the limited skill set of an EMT-I.

== Training ==
=== Basic and Intermediate ===
There is not currently an official national training standard for EMS personnel in Iceland. As a result, the training levels which operate by default are those currently in use in the United States. Training for EMT Basic, and EMT Intermediate are directly comparable with the U.S. standards. These are conducted by the Icelandic Centre for EMS Education.

=== Paramedic ===
Since paramedic training is currently unavailable in Iceland, most of these were trained and certified in the United States at the University of Pittsburgh's Center for Emergency Medicine. Paramedics scope of practice is similar to what paramedics in USA are used to, this includes strong analgesia, vasopressors and cardiac drugs. in Iceland. Paramedics are also sometimes used to provide care on air ambulance transports. Paramedics completing training in the U.S. are validated and certified by the Icelandic directorate of health.

=== Skills ===
There is, at the moment, limited governing legislation regarding the practice of EMS personnel in Iceland. This is particularly critical regarding the administration of medications. The Icelandic Parliament has assigned responsibility for oversight to the various local health authorities, and, as a result, there is considerable variation in permissible skills. The following, while far from complete, will serve as a general overview of permissible skills at the various levels of training:

==== EMT-Basic ====
- Automatic External Defibrillator
- Supraglottal Airways (Laryngeal Mask, Laryngeal Tube, Fast Trach)

==== EMT-Intermediate ====
- Automatic External Defibrillator
- Supraglottal Airways (Laryngeal Mask, Laryngeal Tube, Fast Trach)
- IV initiation
- Use of Epinephrine in Cardiac Arrest

==== EMT-Paramedic ====
- Manual Defibrillation
- Supraglottal Airways (Laryngeal Mask, Laryngeal Tube, Fast Trach)
- IV initiation
- Use of Epinephrine in Cardiac Arrest
- Endotracheal Intubation
- Surgical Cricothyrotomy

== Communications ==
Iceland uses the European emergency telephone number 112 for all emergencies. Dispatch, which used to be a local function, merged into two dispatch centres, and is in the process of merging into a single, integrated dispatch centre for all three emergency services. The new system involves both CAD and also satellite-based automatic vehicle locating for all emergency vehicles, with plans to expand the system to include snowplows and sanders to expedite emergency responses in bad weather. The system dispatches an estimated 22,000 EMS calls per year.
