= Grímsey =

- Island
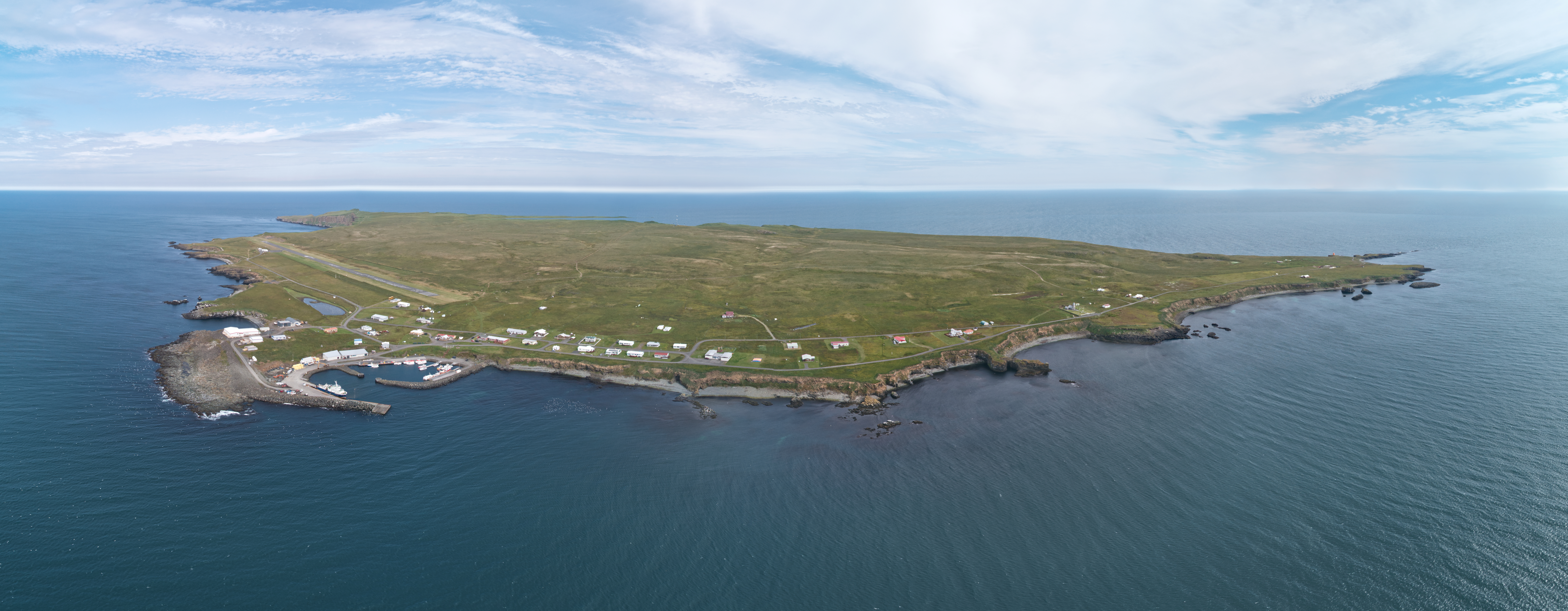
- Grímsey

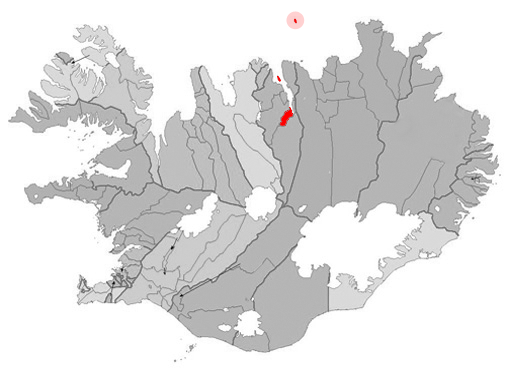
- Location of the Municipality of Akureyri

- The island Grímsey

- Location of the island Grímsey
- Coordinates: 66°33′N 18°00′W
- Country: Iceland
- Constituency: Northeast Constituency
- Region: Northeastern Region
- Municipality: Akureyri

Area
  - Total: 5.3 km^{2} (2.0 sq mi)
  - Land: 5.3 km^{2} (2.0 sq mi)
- Elevation: 105 m (344 ft)

Population (2018)
  - Total: 57
- Time zone: WET
- Website: Official website

Grímsey (Icelandic pronunciation: [ˈkrimsˌeiː]) is a small Icelandic island, 40 kilometres (20 nautical miles) off the north coast of the main island of Iceland, where it straddles the Arctic Circle. Grímsey is also known for the puffins and other sea birds which visit the island for breeding.

The island is administratively part of the municipality of Akureyri on the mainland; before 2009 it constituted the rural municipality of Grímseyjarhreppur [ˈkrimsˌeiːjar̥ˌr̥ɛhpʏr̥]. The island's only settlement is Sandvík [ˈsantˌviːk]. In 2021 Grímsey had 57 inhabitants. The island is accessible by regular ferry and air passenger service.

== Geography ==
Grímsey is the northernmost inhabited Icelandic territory; the rapidly disappearing islet of Kolbeinsey lies some 60 km (30 nmi) farther north, but has never been inhabited. The closest land is the coastal island of Flatey, Skjálfandi, 39.4 km (21.3 nmi) to the south.

There are steep cliffs all along the coastline except on the southwestern shore. Grímsey has an area of 5.3 square kilometres (2.0 sq mi), and a maximum elevation of 105 metres (344 ft).

=== Arctic Circle ===
The Arctic Circle runs through the island, which attracts many of the island's visitors, as it is the only accessible location in Iceland that far north. However, due to long-term oscillations in the Earth's axis, the Arctic Circle is shifting northward by about 14.5 metres (48 ft) per year (varying substantially from year to year due to the complexity of the movement). As of 2020, the place where the line crosses the island is close to the northern tip and by the middle of the 21st century it will pass north of Grimsey altogether.

There are four permanent markers for historical positions of the Arctic Circle, placed in 1717, 1817, and 1917. In 2017, a movable monument – an eight-tonne stone sphere dubbed "Orbis et Globus" – was placed on the circle, and is periodically moved to the corrected location. The Arctic Circle has crossed Grímsey since 1750, but will move northward from the island around the year 2047. For this moment it is planned to roll the sphere "Orbis et Globus" into the ocean.

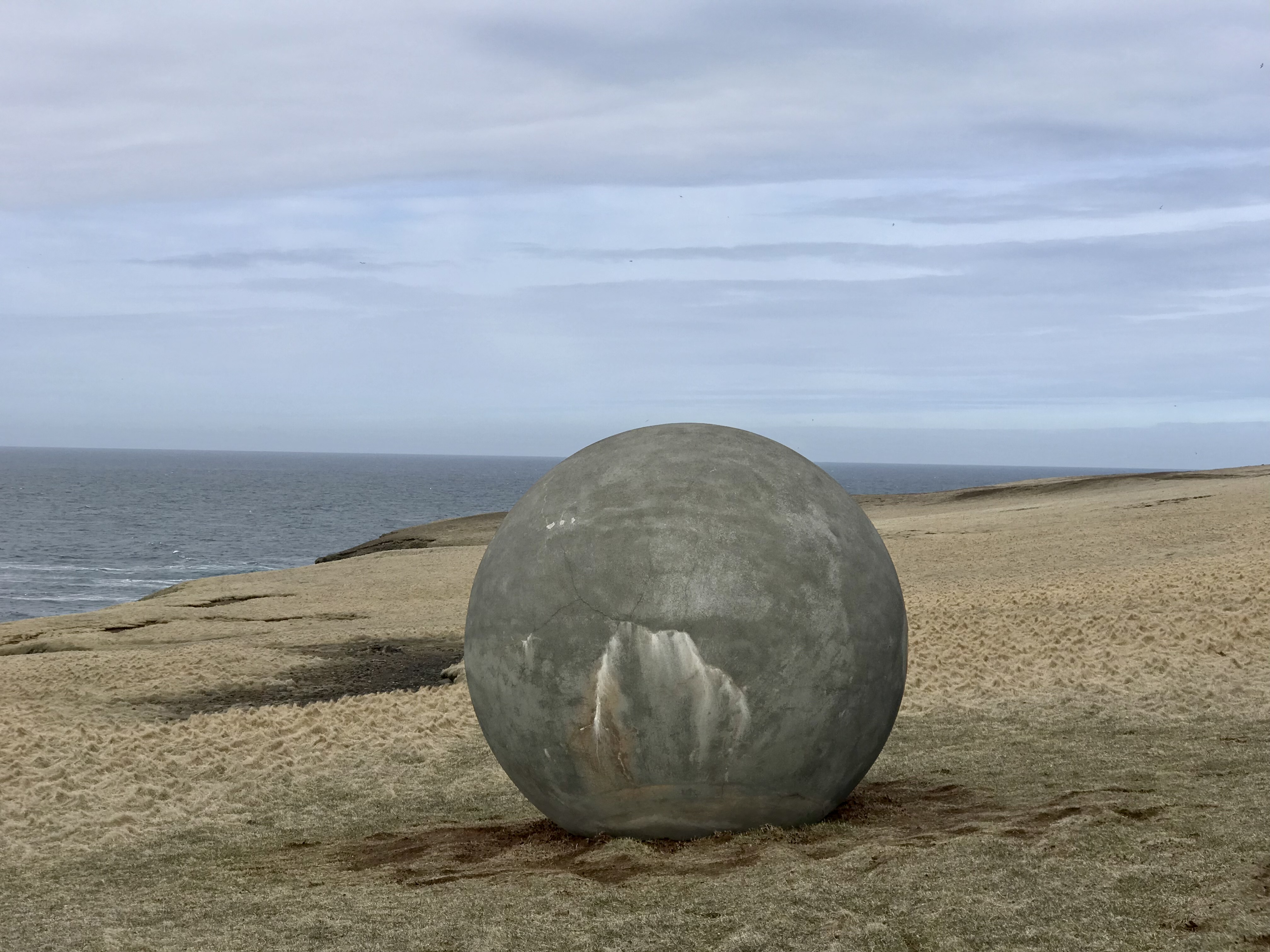
Orbis et Globus sphere on Grimsey Island to mark Arctic Circle

== Climate ==
Despite the northerly latitude, the climate is generally mild because of the North Atlantic Current, which brings warm water from the Gulf of Mexico. The maximum daily mean temperature in any month falls short of 10 °C, so it is within a tundra (ET) climate. The record high temperature of Brú is 22.2 °C (72.0 °F) registered on July 25, 1955.

Climate data for Grímsey (1981-2010 normals)
Month	Jan	Feb	Mar	Apr	May	Jun	Jul	Aug	Sep	Oct	Nov	Dec	Year
Record high °C (°F)	10.6 (51.1)	11.0 (51.8)	13.0 (55.4)	15.7 (60.3)	18.4 (65.1)	18.9 (66.0)	22.2 (72.0)	19.3 (66.7)	20.8 (69.4)	14.3 (57.7)	12.8 (55.0)	18.0 (64.4)	22.2 (72.0)
Mean daily maximum °C (°F)	2.1 (35.8)	1.2 (34.2)	1.2 (34.2)	2.4 (36.3)	6.0 (42.8)	8.8 (47.8)	10.8 (51.4)	11.0 (51.8)	8.6 (47.5)	5.1 (41.2)	3.5 (38.3)	2.6 (36.7)	5.3 (41.5)
Daily mean °C (°F)	0.0 (32.0)	−1.0 (30.2)	−0.9 (30.4)	0.5 (32.9)	3.8 (38.8)	6.5 (43.7)	8.6 (47.5)	8.9 (48.0)	6.6 (43.9)	3.3 (37.9)	1.6 (34.9)	0.4 (32.7)	3.2 (37.7)
Mean daily minimum °C (°F)	−2.1 (28.2)	−3.2 (26.2)	−2.9 (26.8)	−1.4 (29.5)	1.5 (34.7)	4.2 (39.6)	6.4 (43.5)	6.7 (44.1)	4.5 (40.1)	1.5 (34.7)	−0.3 (31.5)	−1.8 (28.8)	1.1 (34.0)
Record low °C (°F)	−15.6 (3.9)	−14.6 (5.7)	−17.2 (1.0)	−15.0 (5.0)	−8.9 (16.0)	−2.8 (27.0)	0.7 (33.3)	−3.9 (25.0)	−3.1 (26.4)	−6.8 (19.8)	−12.2 (10.0)	−12.3 (9.9)	−17.2 (1.0)
Average precipitation mm (inches)	26.5 (1.04)	41.5 (1.63)	31.3 (1.23)	23.8 (0.94)	11.4 (0.45)	10.0 (0.39)	27.8 (1.09)	31.5 (1.24)	35.8 (1.41)	30.3 (1.19)	28.9 (1.14)	24.5 (0.96)	323.3 (12.71)
Average precipitation days	18.0	24.0	17.3	20.8	11.7	10.5	15.7	14.7	20.0	22.0	21.0	20.0	215.7
Source: Météo Climat (averages)

== Biology ==
Though treeless, the island's vegetation cover is rich, consisting of marshland, grass, and moss, and the island is home to many birds, especially auks. Gulls and arctic terns also inhabit the island. The island has been designated an Important Bird Area (IBA) by BirdLife International because it supports large seabird breeding colonies of black-legged kittiwakes, Atlantic puffins, razorbills and common murres.

== Economy and society ==
The origin of the name is uncertain. The island is not mentioned in the book of settlements. It may be named after a man named Grím, otherwise unknown.

The principal industrial activity is commercial fishing. Agriculture and collecting seabird eggs are also common. Grímsey Airport has a 1,036m north–south runway on the west side of the island, with regular flights to Akureyri. A ferry runs three to five days a week, connecting the island with Dalvík on the mainland.

The single settlement on the southwest side of the island is officially known as Sandvík. It has a community center, a shop, a library, a public indoor swimming pool, and a school from kindergarten to grade 8. (Beyond this age, students travel to Akureyri for further education.) Grímsey has two small hotels, a camp ground, and a nine-hole disc golf course.

The island has acquired a reputation for being a bastion of chess-playing. On learning this in the 1870s, American scholar and keen chess player Willard Fiske took an interest in Grímsey, sending supplies, supporting the economy, and leaving money in his will, though he never visited the island.

The Protestant Church (Midgard) on Grímsey was destroyed by a fire in September 2021. It had been built from driftwood in 1867 and renovated in 1956. A choir and tower were added in 1932. The nave was roughly 7.7 metres in length and 4.75 metres broad. It was again reconstructed, and the New Midgard Church was consecrated on August 10, 2025 after a lengthy reconstruction project. The ringing of the bells at Hallgrímskirkja in Reykjavík coincided with the commencement of the dedication ceremony in Grímsey.

In 2022, a 12kW solar power array and a 36kW wind turbine were installed as part of a project to reduce the island's dependence on diesel powered electricity, as it is unconnected to the Icelandic grid.

== Gallery ==
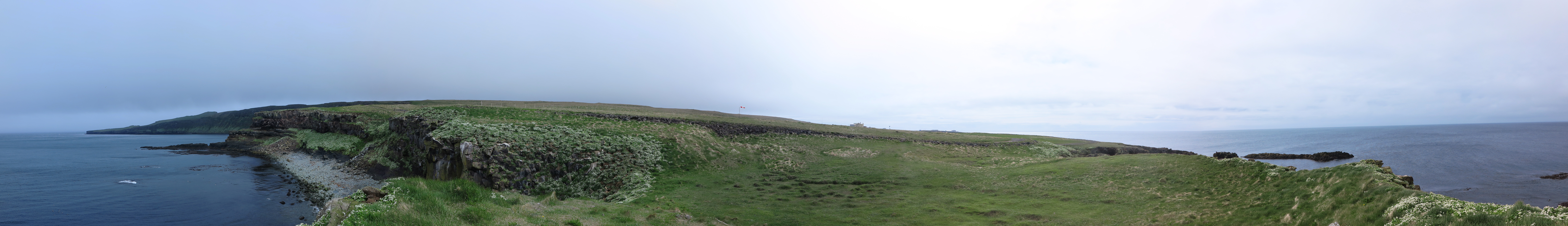
Grímsey coastline

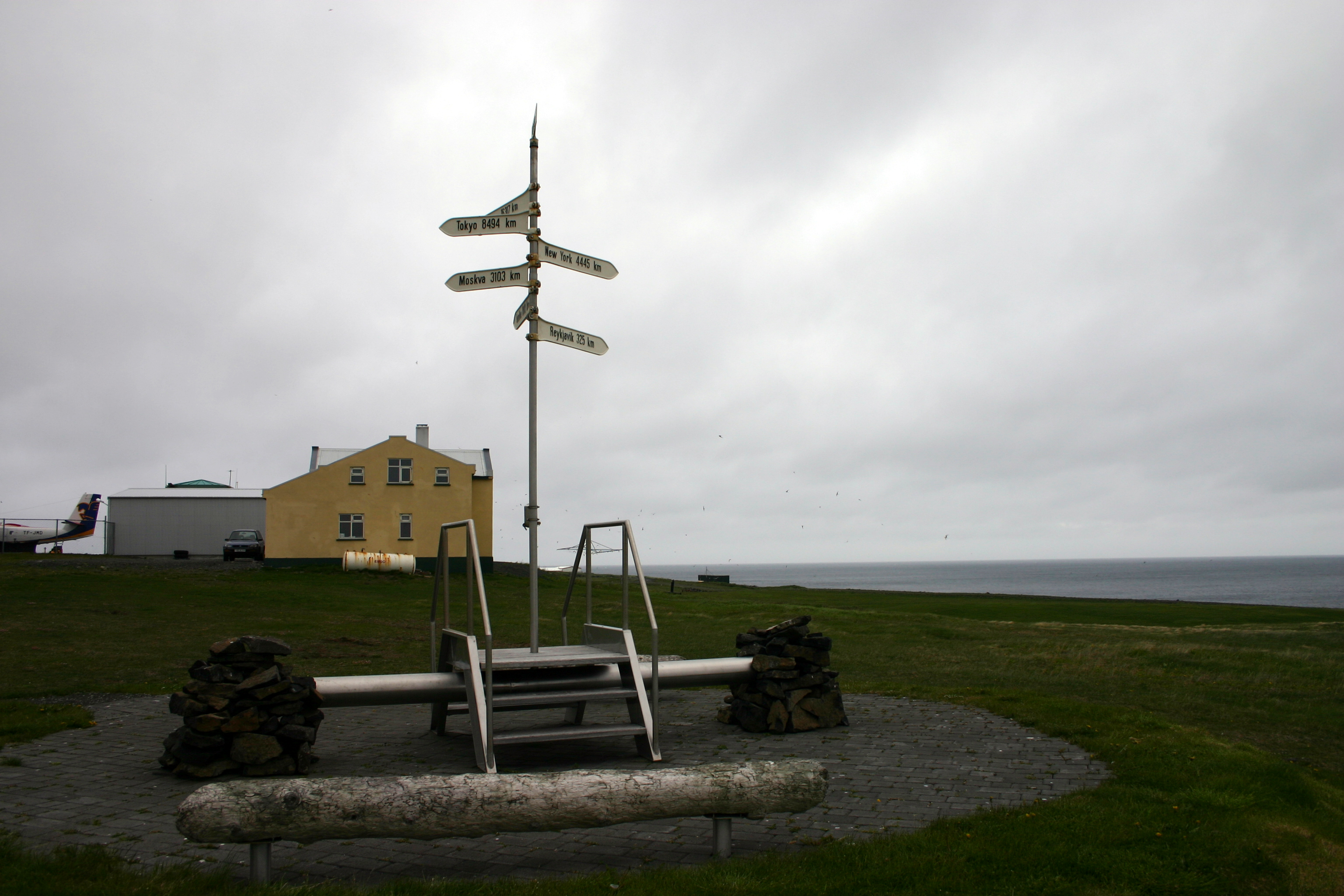
Older Monument to Arctic Circle on Grímsey

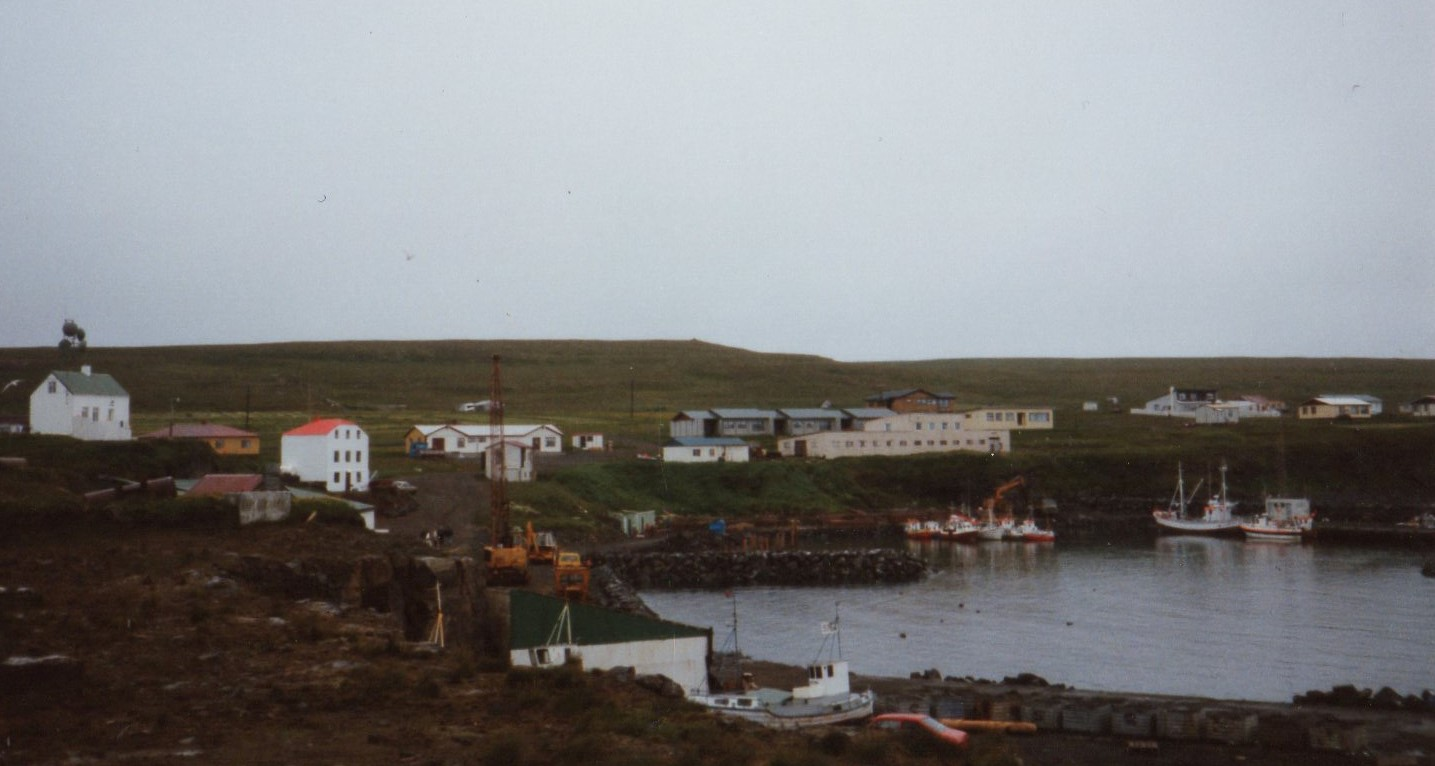
Grímsey, Harbour

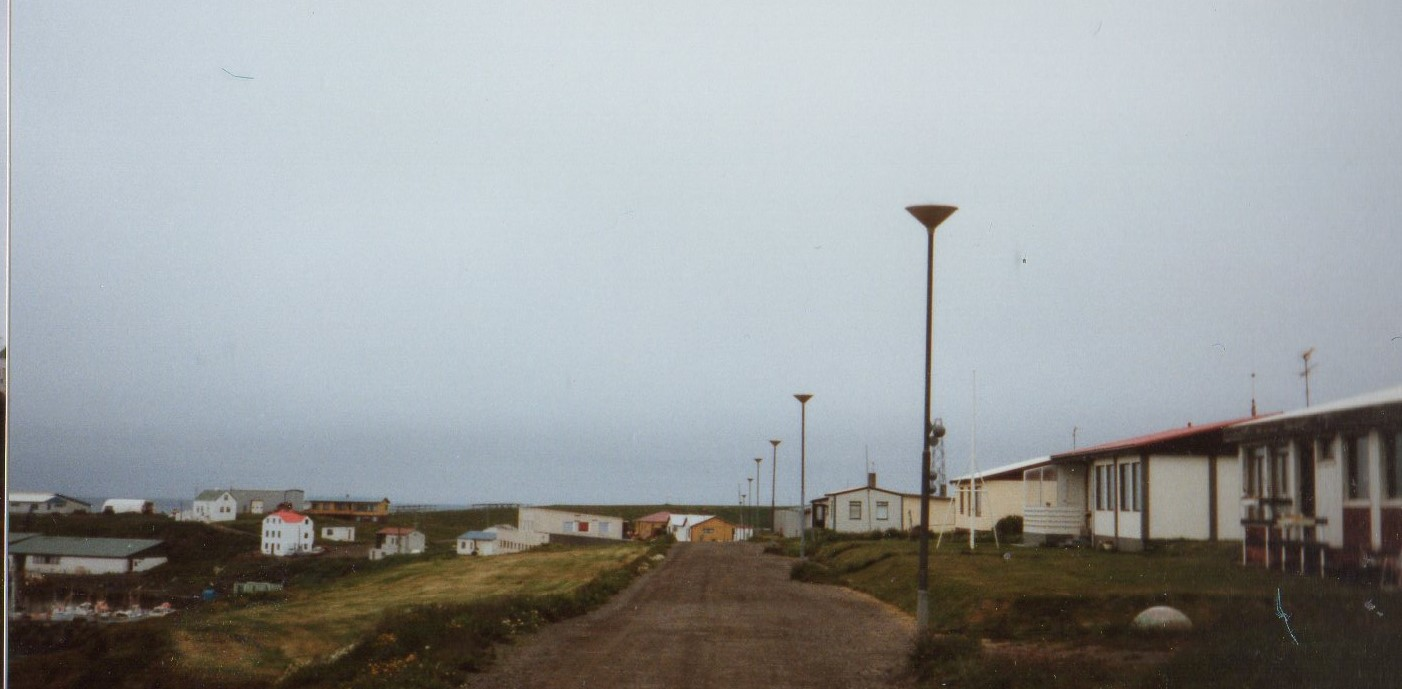
Main Street

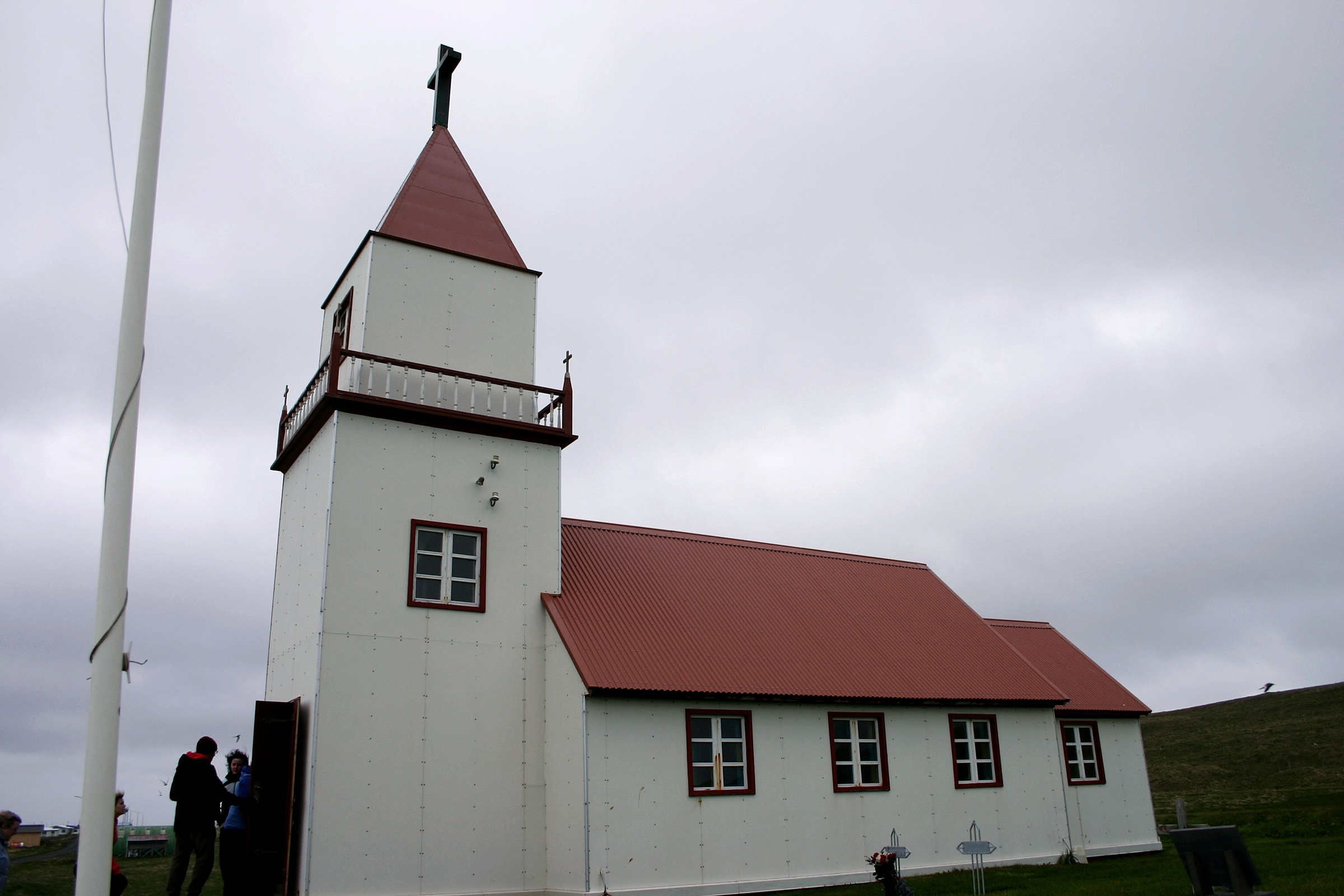
Grímsey Church in June 2008

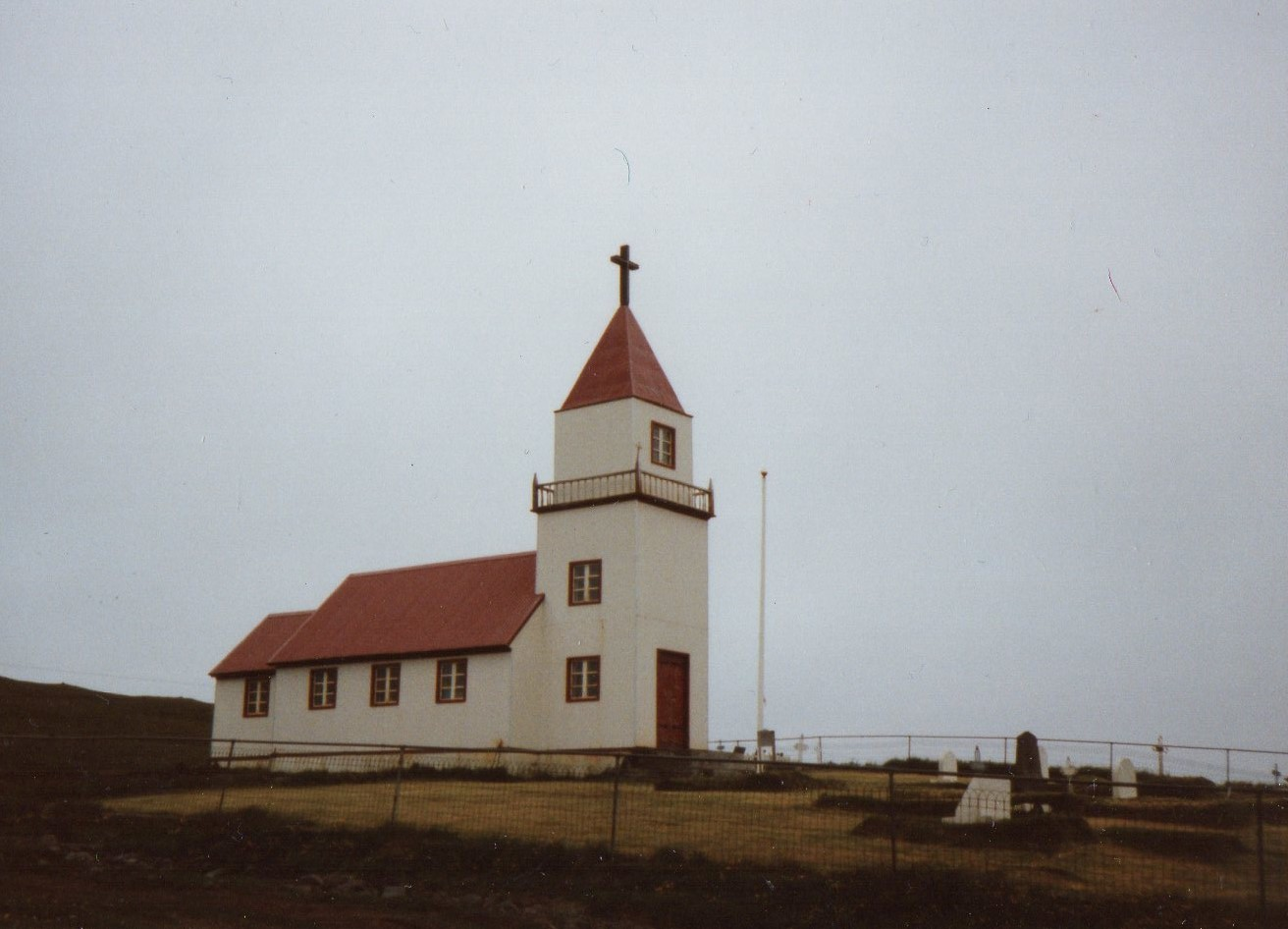
Grímsey Church and cemetery

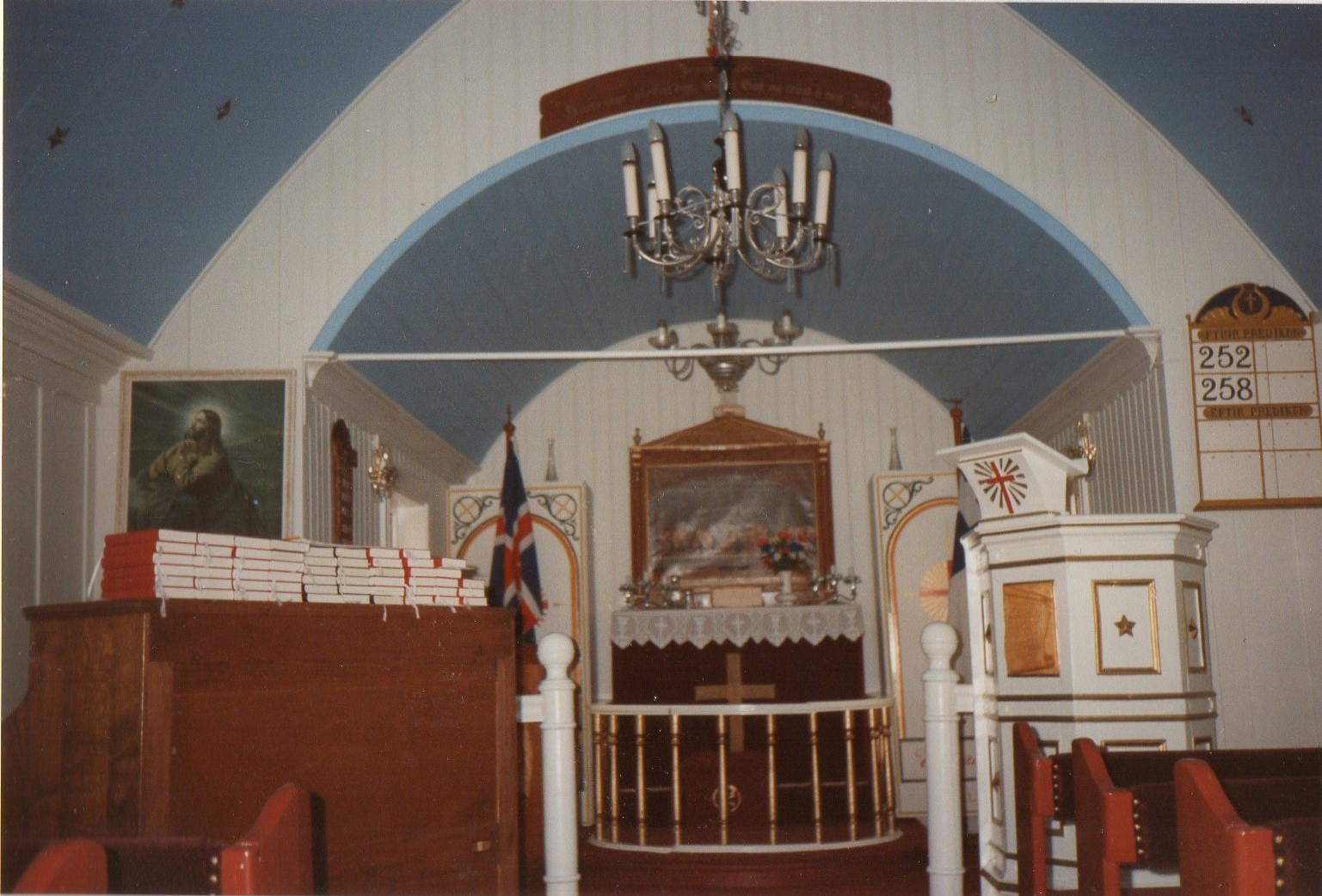
Grímsey Church, interior

== See also ==
- List of extreme points of Iceland

== Sources ==
- Places along the way...Grímsey, published by Bókaútgafan að Hofi
