= Akureyri Airport =

International airport in North Iceland

Akureyri Airport Akureyrarflugvöllur

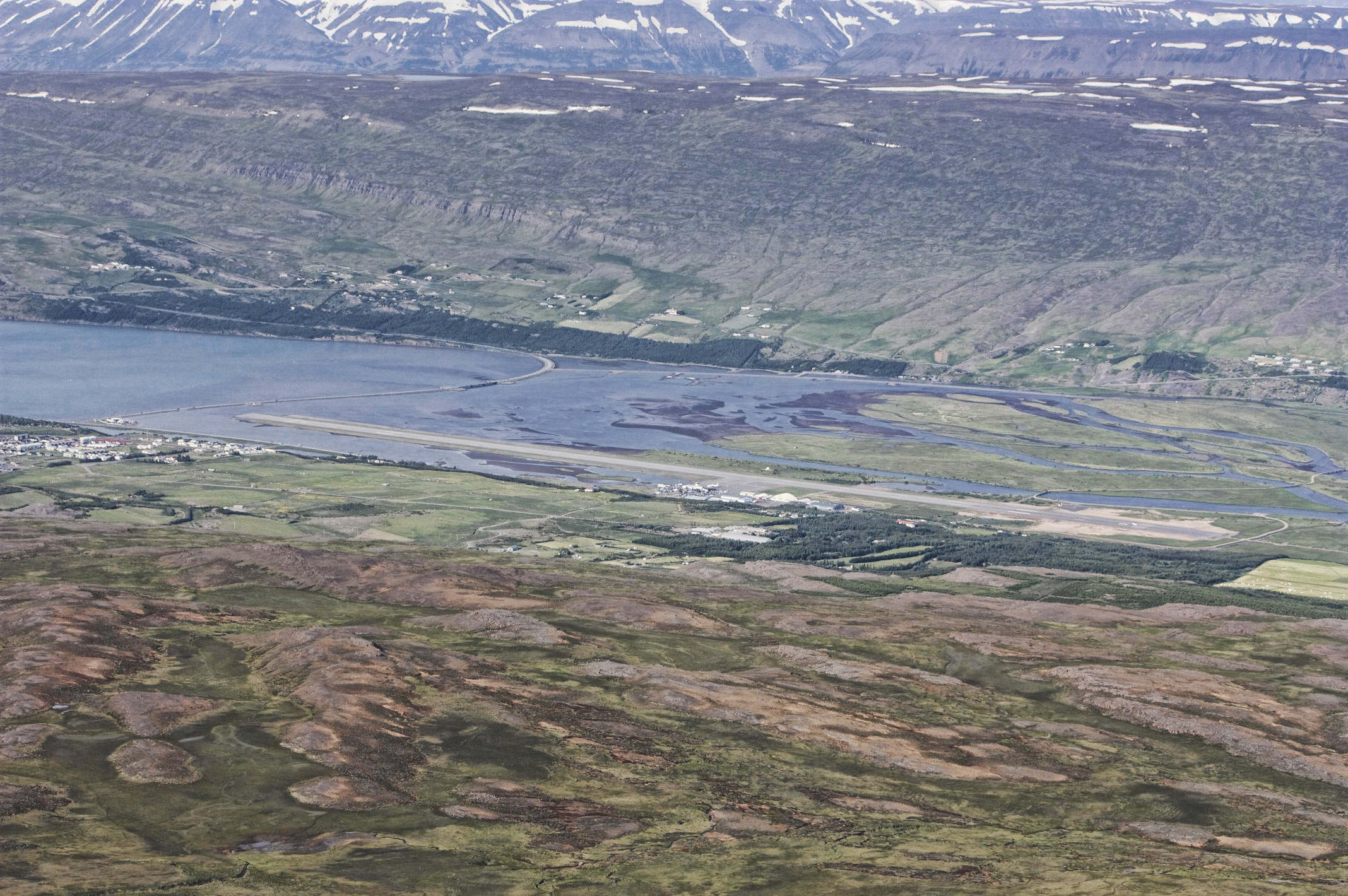
- IATA: AEY; ICAO: BIAR

Summary
- Airport type: Public
- Owner: Isavia
- Serves: Akureyri and Norðurland eystra, Iceland
- Hub for: Norlandair
- Elevation AMSL: 6 ft (1.8 m)
- Coordinates: 65°39′40″N 18°04′20″W
- Website: www.innanlandsflugvellir.is/en/akureyri-airport/

Map
- Location of airport in Iceland

Runways
| Direction | Length | | Surface |
| Direction | m | ft | Surface |
|---|---|---|---|
| 01/19 | 2,400 | 7,874 | Asphalt |

Statistics
- Aircraft movements (2018): 15,493
- Passengers (2018): 202,252
- Cargo (2018): 302 tons
- Airport data: AIP Iceland GCM Google Maps

Akureyri Airport (Icelandic: Akureyrarflugvöllur [ˈaːkʏrˌeiːrarˌflʏɣˌvœtlʏr̥], regionally also [ˈaːkʰʏr-]; IATA: AEY, ICAO: BIAR) is an international airport in Akureyri, Iceland, three kilometres (two miles) south of the town centre.

Icelandair and Norlandair link the airport with several domestic locations and limited service to Greenland . The airlines easyJet, Edelweiss Air and Transavia serve seasonal international destinations.

== History ==
Scheduled air travel to Akureyri started in 1928 when Flugfélag Íslands ("Airline of Iceland") began flying on seaplanes to Reykjavík, landing on the fjord of Eyjafjörður near downtown Akureyri. The airline was short-lived, as it ceased operations after only three years. Another airline, Flugfélag Akureyrar ("Airline of Akureyri"), was founded in 1937 and in 1940 it changed its name to Flugfélag Íslands, though it was in no way affiliated with its predecessor. At this point, Flugfélag Akureyrar was the predecessor to Icelandair.

In 1944, Loftleiðir started flying from Reykjavík on Grumman Goose seaplanes, which added competition to the popular route. An airstrip at Melgerðismelar, around 20 km south of Akureyri, was established in the 1940s during WWII.

=== Establishment of current runway ===
The current airport opened in December 1954 with a 1000-metre runway, constructed on the delta of Eyjafjörður river with an expanded landfill, a few kilometres from the town's center. This replaced the landing strip at Melgerðismelar. A new terminal was constructed in 1961 and expanded in 1970 and 1996 along with runway extensions. The runway was renovated in 2000 to better equip the airport for International flights.

==== Airlines ====
In 1952, Loftleiðir decided to cease domestic flights and to concentrate on international flights to Europe and North America. This left Flugfélag Íslands alone on the route, operating Douglas DC-3 aircraft until 1973. In 1965, the airline introduced the Fokker F27 to its domestic fleet. It replaced this craft with the Fokker 50 in 1992, which have since been replaced by DeHavilland Canada Dash 8 planes.

In 1973, Loftleiðir and Flugfélag Íslands merged into Icelandair. One year later, a new airline was founded in Akureyri, Flugfélag Norðurlands, and operated numerous domestic flights and charter flights to Greenland.

In 1997, The domestic division of Icelandair merged with Flugfélag Norðurlands to form Flugfélag Íslands (the third airline with that name), or Icelandair as it is called in English.

In 2006, Mýflug, under a contract with the Icelandic government, began providing ambulance flight service to Iceland, with a specially equipped aircraft based at Akureyri airport. In 2008, the operation was moved to the newly built Hangar 13.

In 2008, Norlandair was founded, which serves destinations in north-eastern Iceland in cooperation with Icelandair and operates various charter flights to Greenland.

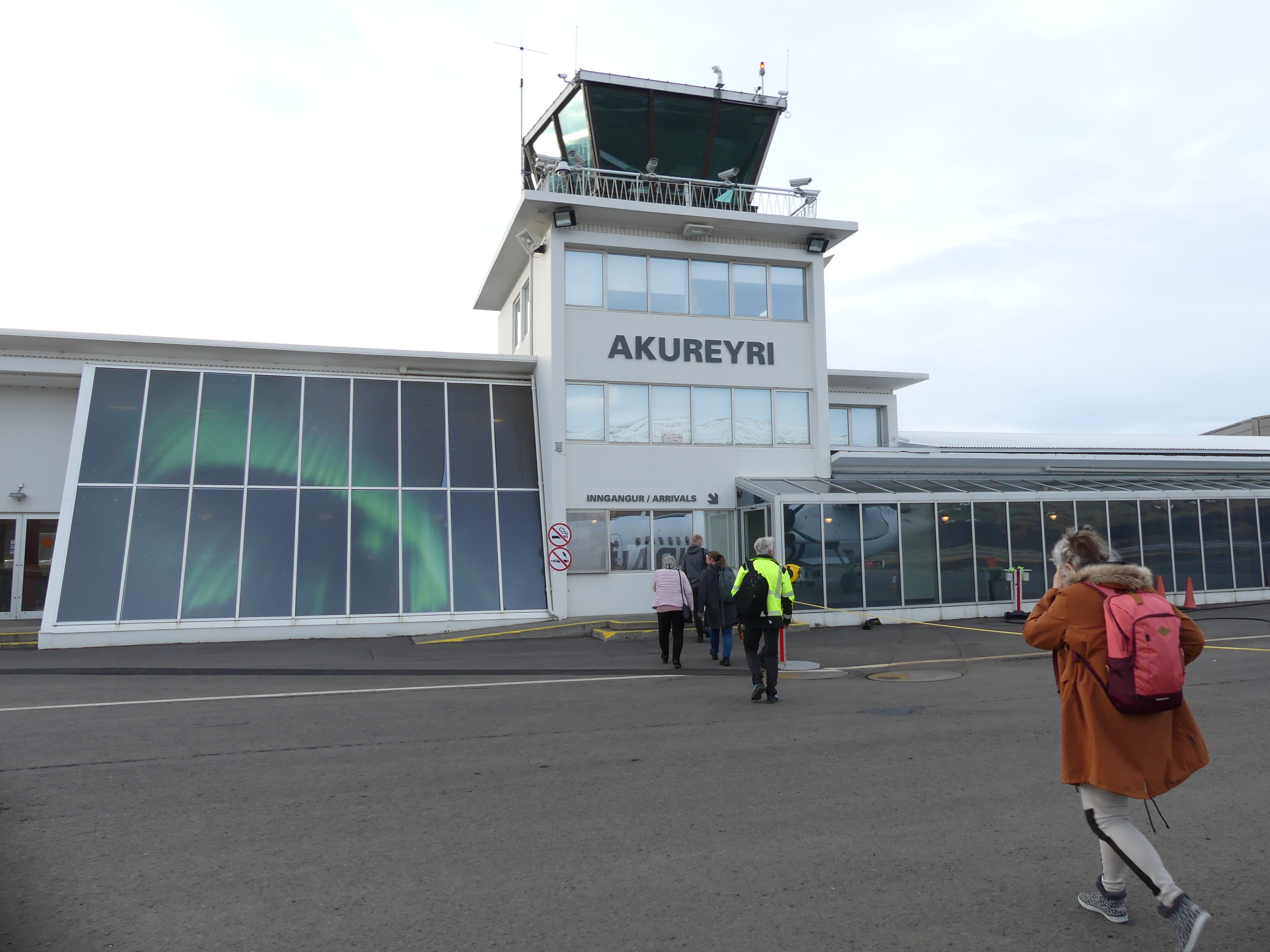
Akureyri Airport in northeastern Iceland

In 2022, the first airline specifically serving international destinations in northern Iceland, Niceair, began operations at Akureyri airport. They initially began serving Copenhagen and Tenerife. Niceair suspended all operations in April 2023 due to HiFly Malta, which operated the plane, not making payments to the owner of the plane. Niceair subsequently declared bankruptcy in May 2023.

=== Recent developments and expansion ===
Isavia and the local tourism industry stakeholders have long-term plans to increase capacity and introduce new international routes to the airport. Expansion of the passenger terminal as well as the ramp area is necessary to better suit the needs of larger aircraft and an increasing number of passengers, and also to establish a safe diversionary airport for flights to Keflavík Airport, Iceland's largest airport. The need for a larger terminal and ramp was obvious during the 2010 eruptions of Eyjafjallajökull, when many international flights were operated from Akureyri after Keflavík airport was closed due to volcanic ash. Passenger numbers were far above the terminal's capacity and a limited amount of ramp space was available for large aircraft.

In the summer of 2009, Isavia completed an almost two-year runway renovation program. It included lengthening the runway by 500 m (1,600 ft) to the south, improving runway lighting and enhancing the approach system. In 2010, a new instrument landing system (ILS) approach navigational aid was installed for runway 01 (southern approach), and in 2020 ILS was added for runway 19 (northern approach).

In 2012, 2016–2019 and 2023, Icelandair operated a service to Keflavík International Airport, only available for international connecting passengers.

A 35,000 m^{2} (380,000 sq ft) ramp area extension was opened in October 2023. This required large amounts of landfill material into the river delta. A large portion of the material needed was obtained from scrap rubble from the construction of the nearby Vaðlaheiðargöng tunnel.

Isavia opened an expanded passenger terminal in December 2024 which added 1,100 m^{2} (12,000 sq ft) of terminal area, with separate areas for international and domestic traffic as well as dedicated security check and passport control facilities, as well as a duty-free store.

== Airlines and destinations ==
The following airlines operate regular scheduled flights at Akureyri Airport:

| Airlines | Destinations |
|---|---|
| easyJet | Seasonal: London–Gatwick, Manchester |
| Edelweiss Air | Seasonal: Zürich |
| Icelandair | Reykjavík; Seasonal: Tenerife–South (begins 19 October 2027) |
| Norlandair | Grímsey, Nerlerit Inaat, Vopnafjörður, Þórshöfn |
| Transavia | Seasonal charter: Amsterdam |

== Ground transport ==
The airport is located approximately 3 km (1.9 mi) south of Akureyri, which is on Route 1 (Ring road). The town of Akureyri is the largest in Northern Iceland and the airport serves the wider region, including Siglufjörður, Ólafsfjörður, Dalvík, Húsavík and Mývatn.

Taxis are available at the airport. The airport has several car rental options available.

=== Buses ===
Since 2022, a local company called Sýsli-ferðir has offered bus services branded as 'Akureyri Airport Bus' operating as route 100, however this service presently only operates in connection with international flights.

From the beginning of 2026, several intercity bus routes operated by Strætó will serve the airport in connection with domestic flight schedules, offering direct connections to Akureyri town centre and other larger settlements in north Iceland.

== See also ==
- Transport in Iceland
- List of airports in Iceland
