= Grímsey Airport =

Airport in Iceland

Grímsey Airport Grímseyjarflugvöllur
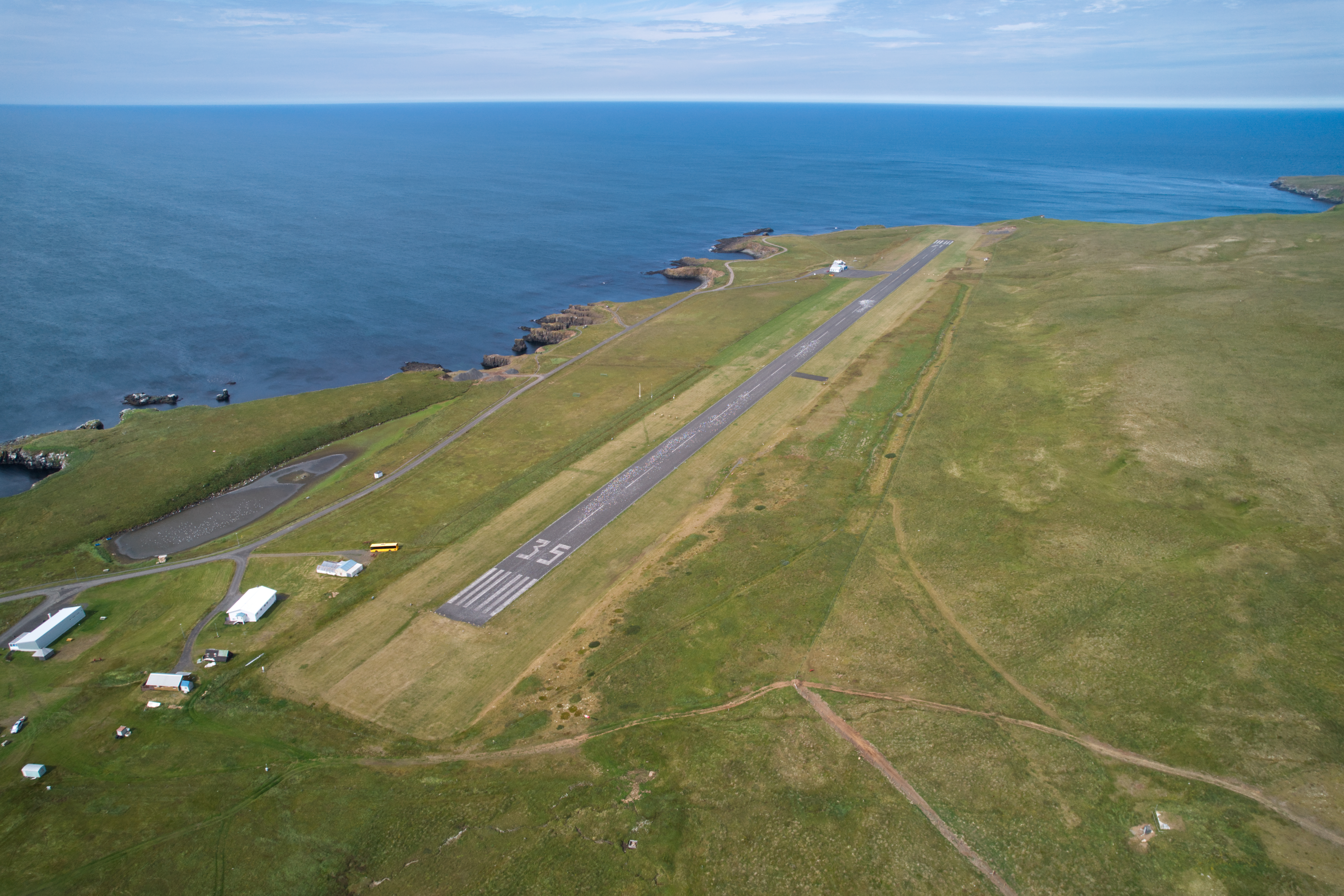
- IATA: GRY; ICAO: BIGR

Summary
- Airport type: Public
- Operator: ISAVIA
- Serves: Grímsey, Iceland
- Elevation AMSL: 81 ft / 25 m
- Coordinates: 66°32′45″N 18°01′00″W

Map
- Location within Iceland

Runways
Direction	Length		Surface
Direction	m	ft	Surface
18/36	1,036	3,399	Asphalt

Statistics (2016)
- Passengers: 3,436
- Source: AIP Iceland GCM Google Maps

Grímsey Airport (Icelandic: Grímseyjarflugvöllur [ˈkrimsˌeiːjarˌflʏɣˌvœtlʏr̥]) (IATA: GRY, ICAO: BIGR) is an airport serving Grímsey, a small Icelandic island 40 kilometres (25 mi) off the north coast of the main island of Iceland.

== Airlines and destinations ==
Airlines	Destinations
Norlandair	Akureyri

== Statistics ==
=== Passengers and movements ===
	Number of passengers (Note: Number of passengers including domestic, international and transit.)	Number of movements (Note: Number of movements represents total takeoffs and landings during that year.)
2003	4,403	608
2004	4,405	624
2005	4,022	594
2006	3,385	524
2007	4,671	662
2008	3,636	688
2009	3,389	558
2010	3,674	558
2011	3,256	468
2012	3,879	556
2013	4,223	546
2014	3,668	498
2015	3,158	454
2016	3,436	446
2017	2,370	426
2018	2,241	410
2019	2,133	383
2020	855	268
2021	1,605	324

== See also ==
- Transport in Iceland
- List of airports in Iceland
