= Þórshöfn Airport =

Þórshöfn Airport Þórshafnarflugvöllur
- IATA: THO; ICAO: BITN

Summary
- Airport type: Public
- Operator: ISAVIA
- Serves: Þórshöfn, Iceland
- Elevation AMSL: 64 ft / 20 m
- Coordinates: 66°13′06″N 015°20′08″W
- Website: https://www.isavia.is/en/thorshofn-airport

Map
- Location of Airport in Iceland

Runways
Direction	Length		Surface
Direction	m	ft	Surface
02/20	1,199	3,934	Asphalt
- Sources: AIP Iceland, DAFIF

Þórshöfn Airport (Icelandic: Þórshafnarflugvöllur Icelandic pronunciation: [ˈθour̥sˌhapnarˌflʏɣˌvœtlʏr̥]) (IATA: THO, ICAO: BITN) is an airport located in Þórshöfn, a village in northeast Iceland. It is also referred to as Thorshofn Airport in many English-language sources.

== Overview ==
Þórshöfn Airport was previously located about 4.8 km to the northeast, at 66°15′07″N 15°16′23″W, near Sauðanes, and had the ICAO code BITH (but the same IATA code – THO). It had a slightly shorter runway with a gravel surface, which has since been closed. The airport has a very small terminal building of around 12 by 9 meters (39 ft × 30 ft). Domestic airports do not need security checks in Iceland, and the 19-seat Twin Otter aircraft used does not need large terminals.

== Airlines and destinations ==
Airlines	Destinations
Norlandair	Akureyri, Vopnafjörður

== Statistics ==
=== Passengers and movements ===
	Number of passengers (Note: Number of passengers including domestic, international and transit.)	Number of movements (Note: Number of movements represents total takeoffs and landings during that year.)
2015	502	428
2016	441	452
2017	1,079	458
2018	870	468
2019	835	489
2020	467	392
2021	964	532

== Accidents and incidents ==
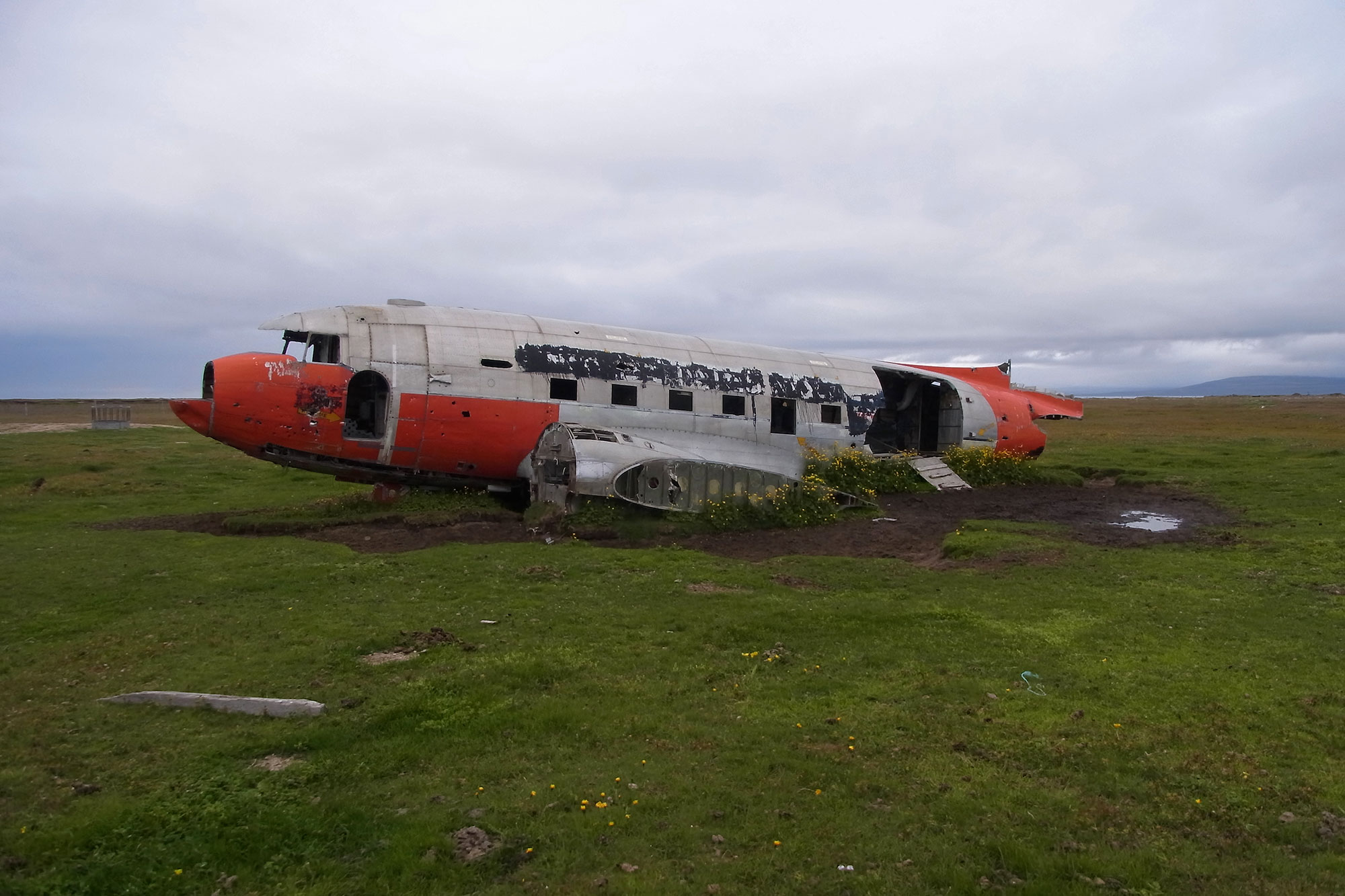
The wreck of the DC-3 is nowadays used as a sheep and horse shelter on private land

In July 1969, Douglas R4D-6 Bu 150187 of the United States Navy was damaged beyond economic repair in an accident at Þórshöfn Airport. Pilot Russell W. Sims Jr, Executive Officer of NAS Keflavik, was flying in supplies and mail when cross winds, unimproved runway surface coupled with what the investigative report stated was pilot error was not able to keep control of the plane upon landing, going off the runway surface and destroying the landing gear. Another source states that the aircraft swung off the runway during takeoff.
