= Isavia =

Icelandic state-owned airport operator

Isavia ohf.
- Company type: State owned
- Industry: Airport operator; Air traffic control; Duty-free retail (until 2025)
- Founded: 30 January 1945 (as Flugmálastjórn); 31 January 2010 (as Isavia)
- Headquarters: Reykjavík Airport; Reykjavík, Iceland
- Area served: Iceland
- Key people: Sveinbjörn Indriðason (Managing director)
- Number of employees: 830 (including subsidiaries 1040)
- Parent: Government of Iceland
- Subsidiaries: Tern Systems; Avians (Isavia ANS); Suluk ApS
- Website: isavia.is

Isavia ohf. is the national airport and air navigation service provider of Iceland. The company operates all public airports and air navigation services in a vast area in the north-eastern Atlantic. The company headquarters is at Reykjavík Airport in Reykjavík.

== History ==
The enterprise was founded in 1945 as the Icelandic Civil Aviation Administration (Flugmálastjórn Íslands). With the creation of the government enterprise Flugstodir ltd. in 2006, the operational services were separated from the regulatory authority of the Icelandic Civil Aviation Administration. 31 January 2010 Flugstodir and Keflavik International Airport Ltd. were merged into a private limited company with 100 per cent state ownership, Isavia ltd.

== Airports ==
Isavia operates all public airports in Iceland. A total of 2,165,423 international passengers and 781,357 domestic passengers passed through these airports in 2011.

- Akureyri Airport
- Bakki Airport
- Bíldudalur Airport
- Egilsstaðir Airport
- Gjögur Airport
- Grímsey Airport
- Hornafjörður Airport
- Ísafjörður Airport
- Keflavík Airport
- Reykjavík Airport
- Sauðárkrókur Airport
- Þingeyri Airport
- Húsavík Airport
- Þórshöfn Airport
- Vestmannaeyjar Airport
- Vopnafjörður Airport
