= Norlandair =

Icelandic airline

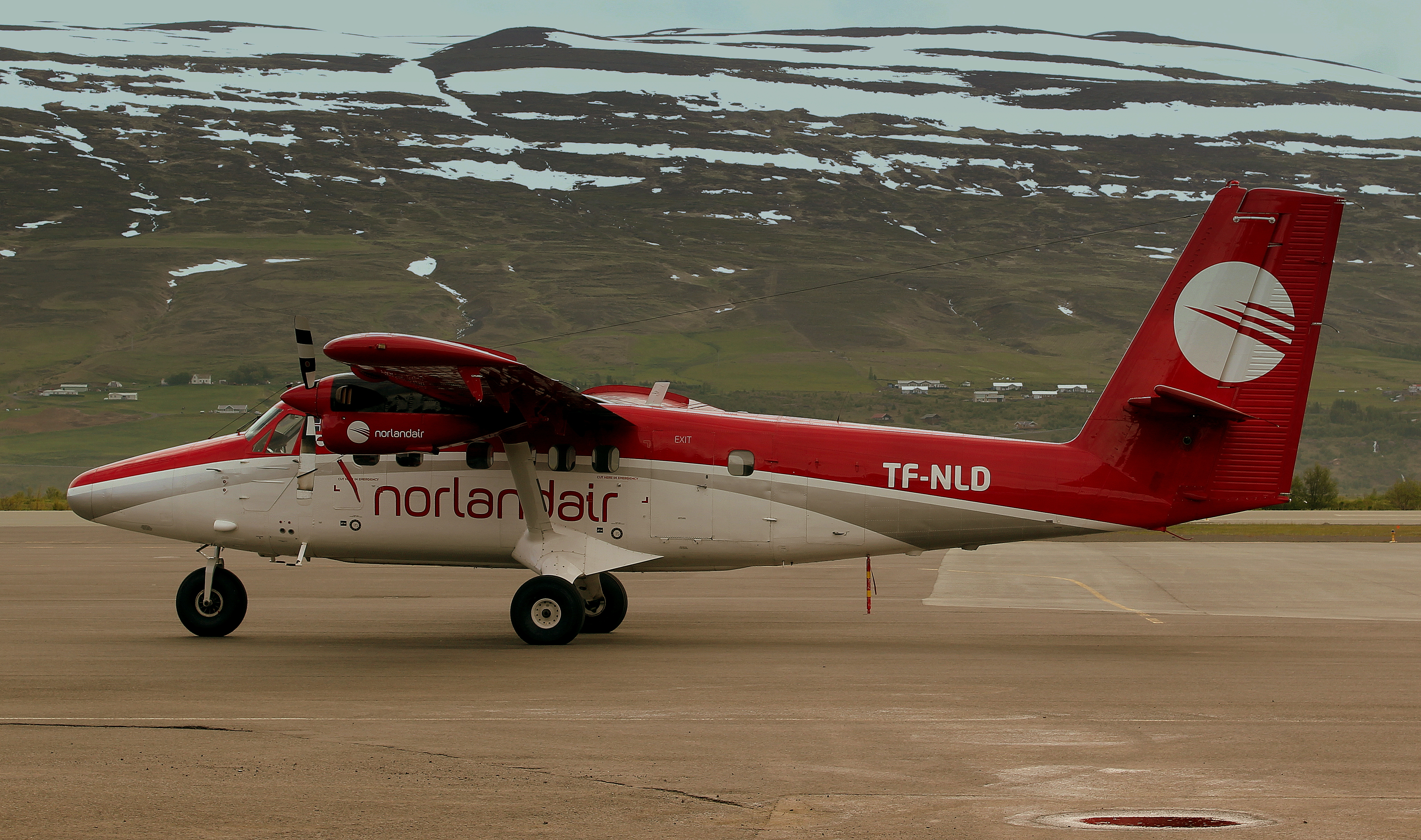
IATA	ICAO	Call sign
—	FNA	NORLAND
- Founded: 1 June 2008; 18 years ago
- Hubs: Akureyri; Reykjavík
- Fleet size: 7
- Destinations: 10
- Headquarters: Akureyri, Iceland
- Key people: Friðrik Adolfsson (CEO)
- Website: www.norlandair.is

Norlandair is an Icelandic airline. It was founded on 1 June 2008 when it acquired the Twin Otter flight operation of Icelandair. It operates domestic scheduled services within Iceland, air charter as well as limited international scheduled services to Greenland.

== History ==
The company traces its roots to a company with the same name, founded in 1974, when a few aviation professionals acquired North Air, based in Akureyri. In 1975 Icelandair bought a stake in the company, enabling it to purchase a Twin Otter aircraft for use in scheduled and charter flights, and to begin serving the east coast of Greenland.

In 1997, Flugfélag Norðurlands and the domestic operations of Icelandair merged as Air Iceland. The charter flight department and the maintenance department for the Twin Otter aircraft were located in Akureyri.

=== Norlandair established ===
In 2008 Air Iceland divested its Twin Otter operations and the maintenance department in Akureyri. A few former employees of Air Iceland and investors bought the operations from Air Iceland and revived the Norlandair name. It acquired Air Iceland's two De Havilland Canada DHC-6 Twin Otters and their associated routes to Grímsey, Vopnafjörður and Þórshöfn.

In 2013, Norlandair took over Air Iceland's route to Constable Point (Nerlerit Inaat).

In 2020, Norlandair secured a contract with the Icelandic Government to provide essential air service to Bíldudalur and Gjögur from Reykjavík Airport and subsequently established a second base there. Also in 2020, a similar contract was agreed with the Greenlandic government to provide service to Nerlerit Inaat Airport.

In 2025, the company took over the existing routes of Mýflug Air.

The Icelandic company KEA owns 43% of Norlandair and Air Greenland owns 39%.

== Destinations ==
Norlandair has ten scheduled destinations from two operating bases.

From Akureyri Airport:

- Grímsey
- Vopnafjörður
- Þórshöfn
- Nerlerit Inaat Airport, Greenland

From Reykjavík Airport:

- Bíldudalur
- Gjögur
- Vestmannaeyjar (winter seasonal)
- Nerlerit Inaat Airport, Greenland

Norlandair also operates various charter and medivac flights in Iceland and Greenland, to Svalbard and other arctic regions.

== Fleet ==
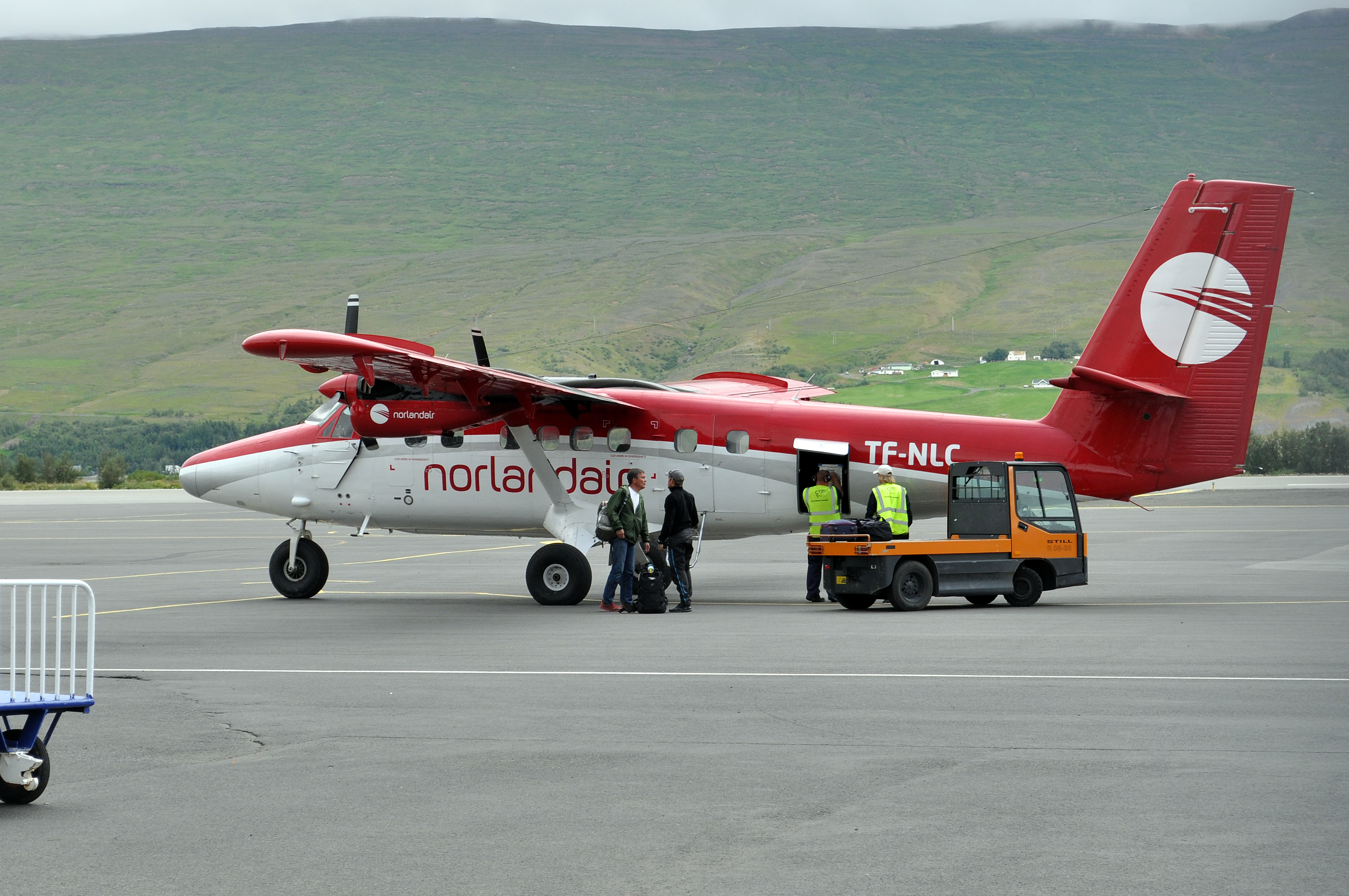
De Havilland DHC-6-300 Twin Otter

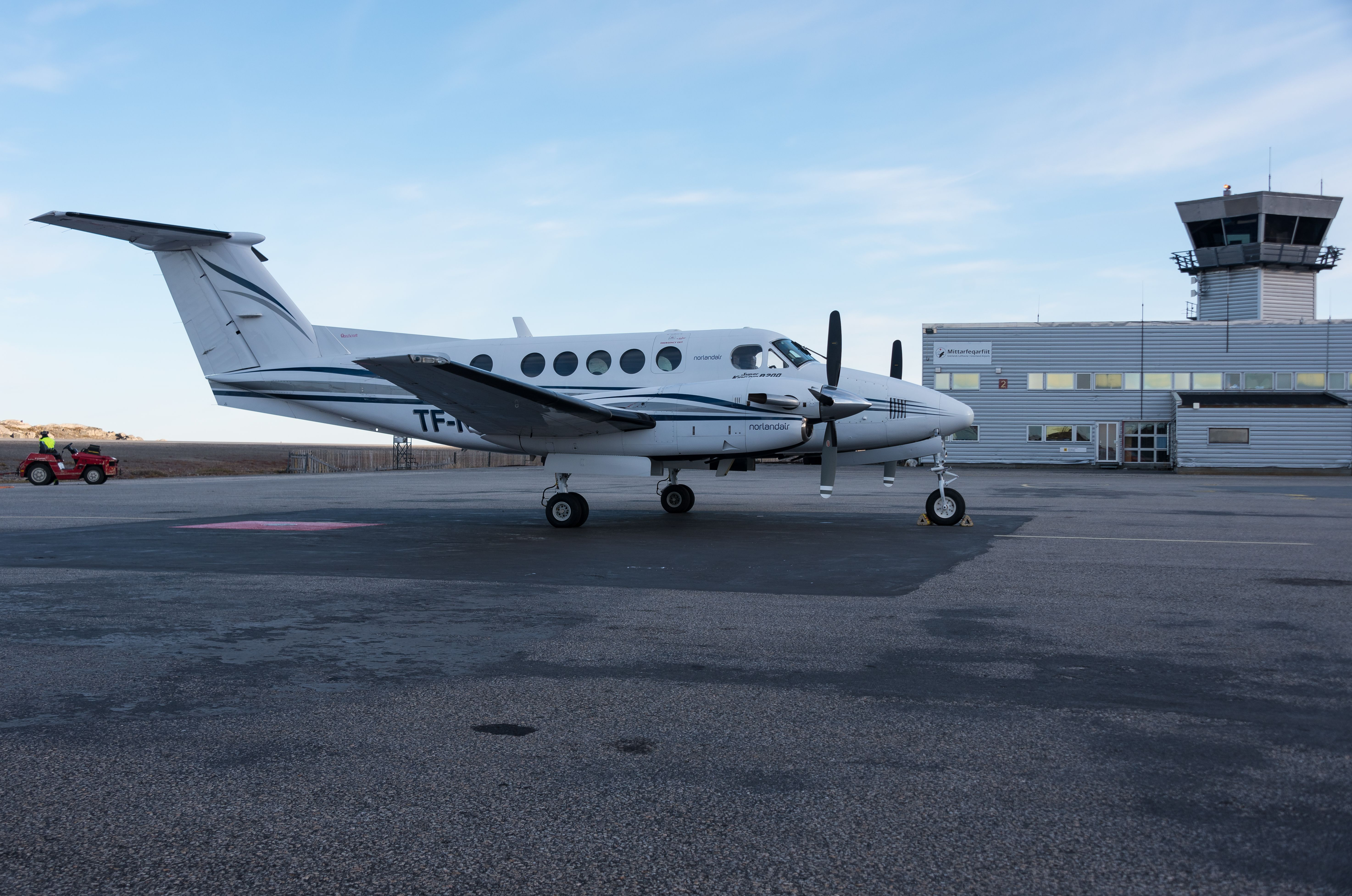
Beechcraft Super King Air B200

Norlandair's fleet consists of three de Havilland Canada DHC-6 Twin Otters aircraft, including one it purchased from Air Greenland in 2011. Additionally it operates three Beechcraft B200 King Air and an GippsAero GA8 Airvan.

Aircraft	In service	Passengers	Notes
De Havilland Canada DHC-6-300 Twin Otter	3 (as of July 2026)	19	
Beechcraft B200 King Air	3	9	
GippsAero GA8 Airvan	1	7	
Total	7		
