= Gjögur Airport =

Airport in Iceland

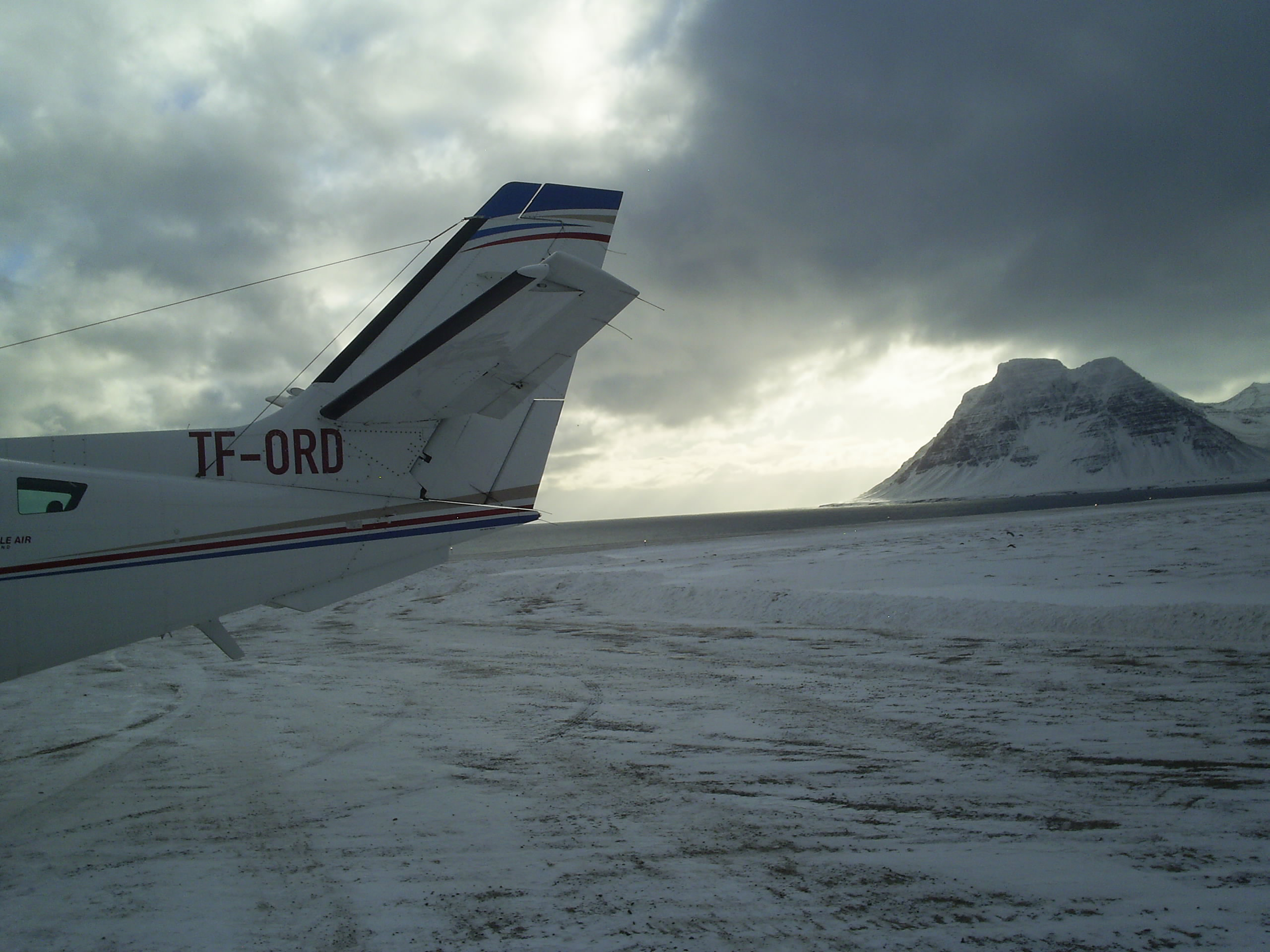
- IATA: GJR; ICAO: BIGJ

Summary
- Airport type: Public
- Operator: ISAVIA
- Serves: Árneshreppur, Iceland
- Elevation AMSL: 98 ft (30 m)
- Coordinates: 65°59′40″N 21°19′45″W

Map
- Location within Iceland

Runways
Direction	Length		Surface
Direction	m	ft	Surface
05/23	960	3,150	Asphalt Stabilized Gravel
- Source: AIP Iceland Google Maps GCM

Gjögur Airport (Icelandic: Gjögurflugvöllur [ˈcœːɣʏrˌflʏɣˌvœtlʏr̥]; IATA: GJR, ICAO: BIGJ) is an airport serving the small population of the Árneshreppur district in the Westfjords of north-west Iceland, on the coast of Húnaflói bay.

== Operations ==
It is staffed part-time by an AFIS controller, and only opens for Norlandair flights, which are twice a week in the winter and once a week in the summer. Gjögur airport is very important to the local population. In the winter, the airport is the only means of access to the entire district, as the access road is impassable. The government of Iceland requires these flights in order to supply the population with food and other goods, and provide passenger transport. Norlandair is the only airline that flies here.

The airport has runway lights, PAPI lights, and taxiway lights. It has an instrument approach using the on-field Gjogur non-directional beacon (Ident: GJ), but this is only short range, e.g. it can be picked up from nearby Hólmavík airfield.

== Airlines and destinations ==
Airlines	Destinations
Norlandair	Reykjavík

== Statistics ==
=== Passengers and movements ===
	Number of passengers (Note: Number of passengers including domestic, international and transit.)	Number of movements (Note: Number of movements represents total takeoffs and landings during that year.)
2015	224	160
2016	397	194
2017	177	146
2018	184	150
2019	116	122
2020	150	136
2021	153	170

== See also ==
- Transport in Iceland
- List of airports in Iceland
