= Vopnafjörður Airport =

Airport in Iceland

Vopnafjörður Airport Vopnafjarðarflugvöllur
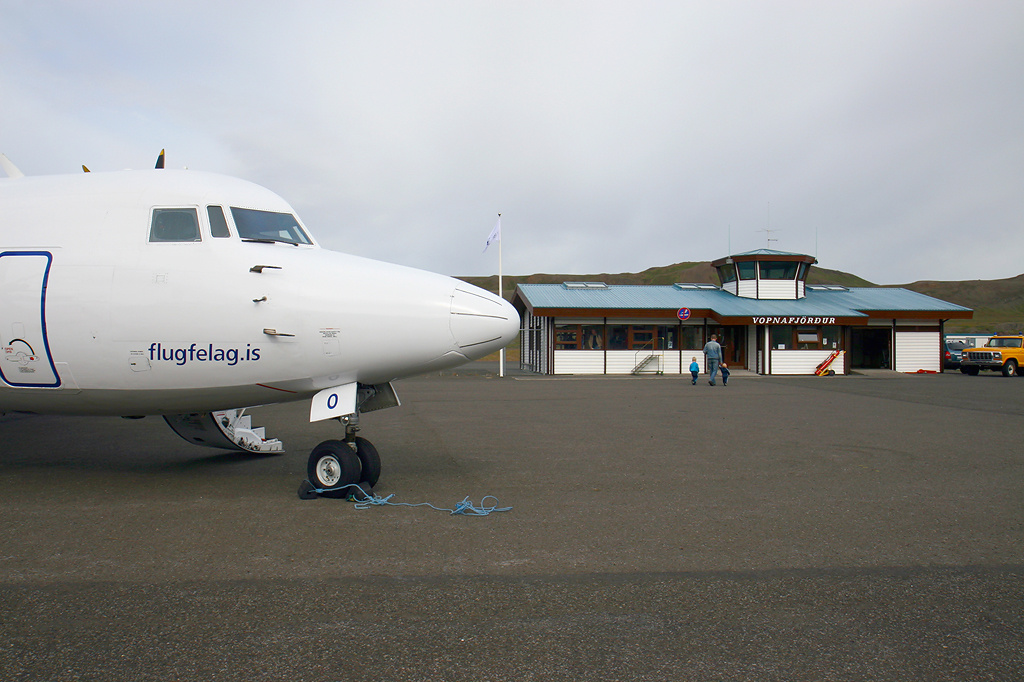
- IATA: VPN; ICAO: BIVO

Summary
- Airport type: Public
- Operator: Isavia
- Serves: Vopnafjörður, Austurland, Iceland
- Elevation AMSL: 10 ft / 3 m
- Coordinates: 65°43′14″N 014°51′02″W
- Website: isavia.is

Map
- Location of the airport in Iceland

Runways
Direction	Length		Surface
Direction	m	ft	Surface
04/22	885	2,903	Asphalt
- Sources: AIP Iceland, STV

Vopnafjörður Airport (Icelandic: Vopnafjarðarflugvöllur [ˈvɔhpnaˌfjarðarˌflʏɣˌvœtlʏr̥]) (IATA: VPN, ICAO: BIVO) is an airport serving the village of Vopnafjörður, in the Eastern Region (Austurland) of Iceland.

== Airlines and destinations ==
Airlines	Destinations
Norlandair	Akureyri, Þórshöfn

== Statistics ==
=== Passengers and movements ===
	Number of passengers (Note: Number of passengers including domestic, international and transit.)	Number of movements (Note: Number of movements represents total takeoffs and landings during that year.)
2003	1,754	596
2004	1,678	602
2005	1,462	610
2006	1,870	646
2007	2,099	676
2008	1,965	588
2009	1,814	556
2010	1,921	538
2011	1,982	576
2012	1,881	594
2013	1,635	576
2014	1,622	672
2015	1,195	532
2016	1,042	570
2017	1,259	532
2018	1,946	526
2019	1,042	528
2020	679	450
2021	1,090	583
