= Mýflug =

Icelandic airline

IATA	ICAO	Call sign
—	MYA	MYFLUG
- Founded: 1985; 41 years ago
- Ceased operations: 2025
- AOC #: IS-014
- Hubs: Reykjavík Airport; Mývatn Airport, Reykjahlíð
- Secondary hubs: Akureyri Airport, Akureyri
- Fleet size: 4
- Headquarters: Reykjahlíð, Iceland
- Key people: Leifur Hallgrímsson Managing Director
- Website: myflug.is

Mýflug (Icelandic pronunciation: [ˈmiːˌflʏːɣ]; lit. 'Mý Air', named after Lake Mývatn in Northern Iceland), also called Myflug Air, was an Icelandic airline established in 1985. It operated charter, medivac and sightseeing flights.

The company operated two aircraft types: Two Beechcraft Super King Air configured for charter and medivac flights and a Cessna 206 for charter operations. Its main focus was on the ambulance flight service provided to Iceland and charter flights to airfields in Iceland and Greenland.

Mýflug also operated sightseeing flights around Lake Mývatn during the summer months.

== History ==
Mýflug was established in 1985.. For the first few year the company offered sightseeing flight in and around Lake Myvatn in north of Iceland and limited charter flight. Scheduled flight to the capital of Reykavik and to Hornafjordur Airport where operated and later, a service from Reykjvik Airport to Husavik Airport was added. This landed the company in financial difficulties and scheduled operations were ceased and focus shifted back to sightseeing and charter flights. In 2006 Myflug won a government bid to provide air ambulance service in the north of Iceland using a dedicated pressurised turboprop aircraft. This contract provided the company with stable operations that grew from one aircraft to two and expanded into country wide service. Mid 2023 Myflug lost a bid to continue providing air ambulance services to Icelandic government. After a hard look at market conditions and opportunities it was decided that returning capital to shareholders was the most viable strategy. Subsequently assets were sold and in June 2025 the AOC was relinquished after 40 years of service.

In 2023 Mýflug acquired the minority stake in Eagle Air, which had run into financial difficulties. Mýflug propped up Eagle Air's operation for a while but in the end the company failed.

== Fleet ==
(as of December 2024)

- 2 Beechcraft Super King Air
- 2 Cessna 206

== Incidents and Accidents ==
- On August 5, 2013, a Beechcraft King Air B200 (TF-MYX), an ambulance flight, crashed on a car racing track just west of Akureyri in the north of Iceland after requesting to fly over the town. Two pilots and a paramedic were on board. The captain and the paramedic died, but the co-pilot escaped with minor injuries.
