= Öxarfjörður =

Fjord in Iceland

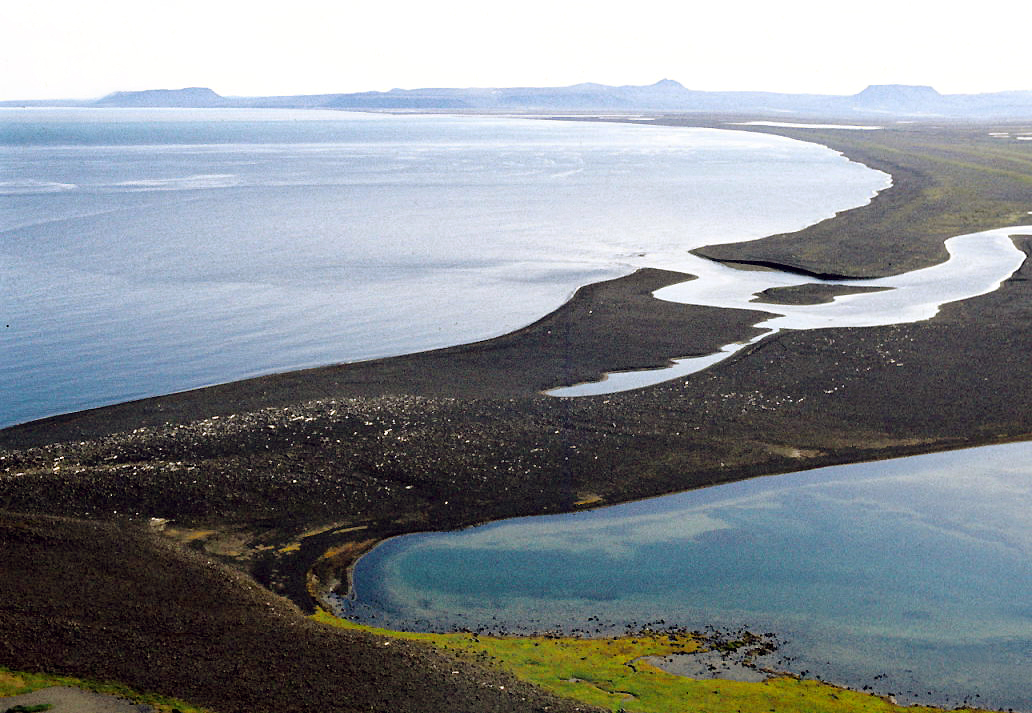
Öxarfjörður

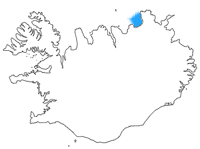
Location of Öxarfjörður in Iceland

Öxarfjörður (Icelandic pronunciation: [ˈœksarˌfjœrðʏr̥]) is a broad fjord in northeastern Iceland, situated between the Tjörnes and Melrakkaslétta headlands.

== Geography ==
Öxarfjörður is encircled by mountain ranges to the west and east, and the Gjástykki [ˈcauːˌstɪhcɪ] lava fields and an area with sand deposited by the glacial river Jökulsá á Fjöllum in the south. The only village in the area is Kópasker with about 130 inhabitants. The Mid-Atlantic Ridge runs through the western part of the fjord before going underwater again. Öxarfjörður went deeper inland in earlier geological times but the glacial river Jökulsá deposited sands from the highlands on a triangular area of about 300 km^{2} called Sandur [ˈsantʏr̥]. Sandur is still trenched by the delta of Jökulsá which is constantly changing its riverbed. There are two big lakes on Sandur, Vikingavatn and Skjálftavatn [ˈscaul̥taˌvahtn̥], the latter one formed by an earthquake in 1976, over the course of which some houses in the area were destroyed.

== Economy ==
The economy of the area is mainly sheep farming. Sheep farm sizes vary between 100 and 1,000 sheep during winter. Between June and September the sheep and the newborn lambs are set free to graze in the highlands. They are driven home by all the farmers of an area on certain days in autumn with the help of horses and dogs. They are driven into a large fence and afterwards split up between the farmers who recognize them by their earmarks. There is a large lamb-processing factory named Fjallalamb in Kópasker. Fishery and tourism also play an important role. People work on fishing boats that set off from Kópasker harbour, and there are two fish farms producing salmon, halibut and trout. Geothermal energy is utilized to heat the houses in the area. It is obtained from hot springs in Sandur.

== Tourism ==
In the area is Jökulsárgljúfur, a former National Park prior to incorporation into the larger Vatnajökull National Park. It is located on the west bank of the glacial river Jökulsá á Fjöllum, and extends 30 km northwards from Dettifoss waterfall, covering 120 km^{2}. Dettifoss is Europe's most powerful waterfall with an annual mean flow rate of 193 m³ per second. Further upstream are Hljóðaklettar [ˈl̥jouːðaˌkʰlɛhtar̥] (Echo Rocks), which are a row of craters featuring basalt columns. In the northern part of the National Park lies Ásbyrgi, a horseshoe-shaped depression, and the main campsite.

There is one scheduled bus connecting the area with Akureyri, the only town with more than 10,000 citizens and an airport in northern Iceland.

== Education ==
There is a school in Öxarfjörður called Lundur or Öxarfjardarskóli this is the only school but it has very few children (around 40 at the time 2025) it is connected to the kindergarten, it is 30 minutes from the main town (Kópasker) and the kids are driven there by bus every morning at 7:30 and at 15:40 back home after school ends. The school is from 8:00 to 15:10.
