= Norðurþing =

- Municipality
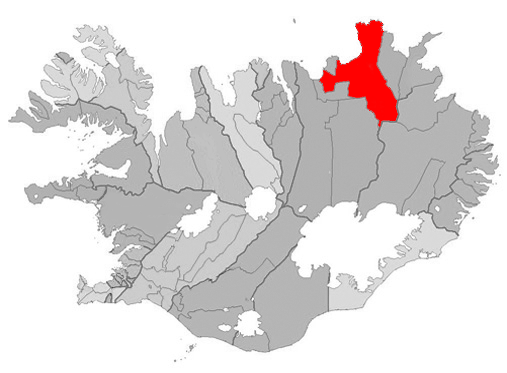
- Location of Norðurþing

- Location within Iceland
- Coordinates: 66.047°N 17.346°W
- Country: Iceland
- Region: Northeastern Region
- Constituency: Northeast Constituency

Government
  - Manager: Katrín Sigurjónsdóttir

Area
  - Total: 3,729 km^{2} (1,440 sq mi)

Population
  - Total: 3,234
  - Density: 0.76/km^{2} (2.0/sq mi)
- Postal code(s): 640, 641, 670, 671, 675
- Municipal number: 6100
- Website: nordurthing.is

Norðurþing (Icelandic pronunciation: [ˈnɔrðʏrˌθiŋk]) is a municipality located in northern Iceland. Norðurþing was formed in 2006 when the municipalities of Húsavík, Öxarfjörður, Raufarhöfn, and Kelduneshreppur were merged after special elections in January 2006 and the region was officially declared a new municipality on 10 June 2006.

The biggest town in the municipality is Húsavík, with a population of 2,307 inhabitants. Other settlements include Kópasker (population 122), Raufarhöfn (population 186), and Skinnastaður.

Húsavík is known as the whale watching capital of Europe and is centrally located for visitors coming to the area who intend to visit Mývatn, Dettifoss, Goðafoss, or the Vatnajökull National Park. Kópasker is home to the Earth Quake Center and a local folk museum.

In Raufarhöfn, an attraction called the Arctic Henge is currently being built and is already attracting visitors.

== Twin towns – sister cities ==
Norðurþing is twinned with:

- Aalborg, Denmark
- Eastport, United States
- Fredrikstad, Norway
- Fuglafjørður, Faroe Islands
- Karlskoga, Sweden
- Qeqertarsuaq, Greenland
- Riihimäki, Finland
