= Diamond Circle =

Tourist route around Húsavík and Lake Mývatn in North Iceland

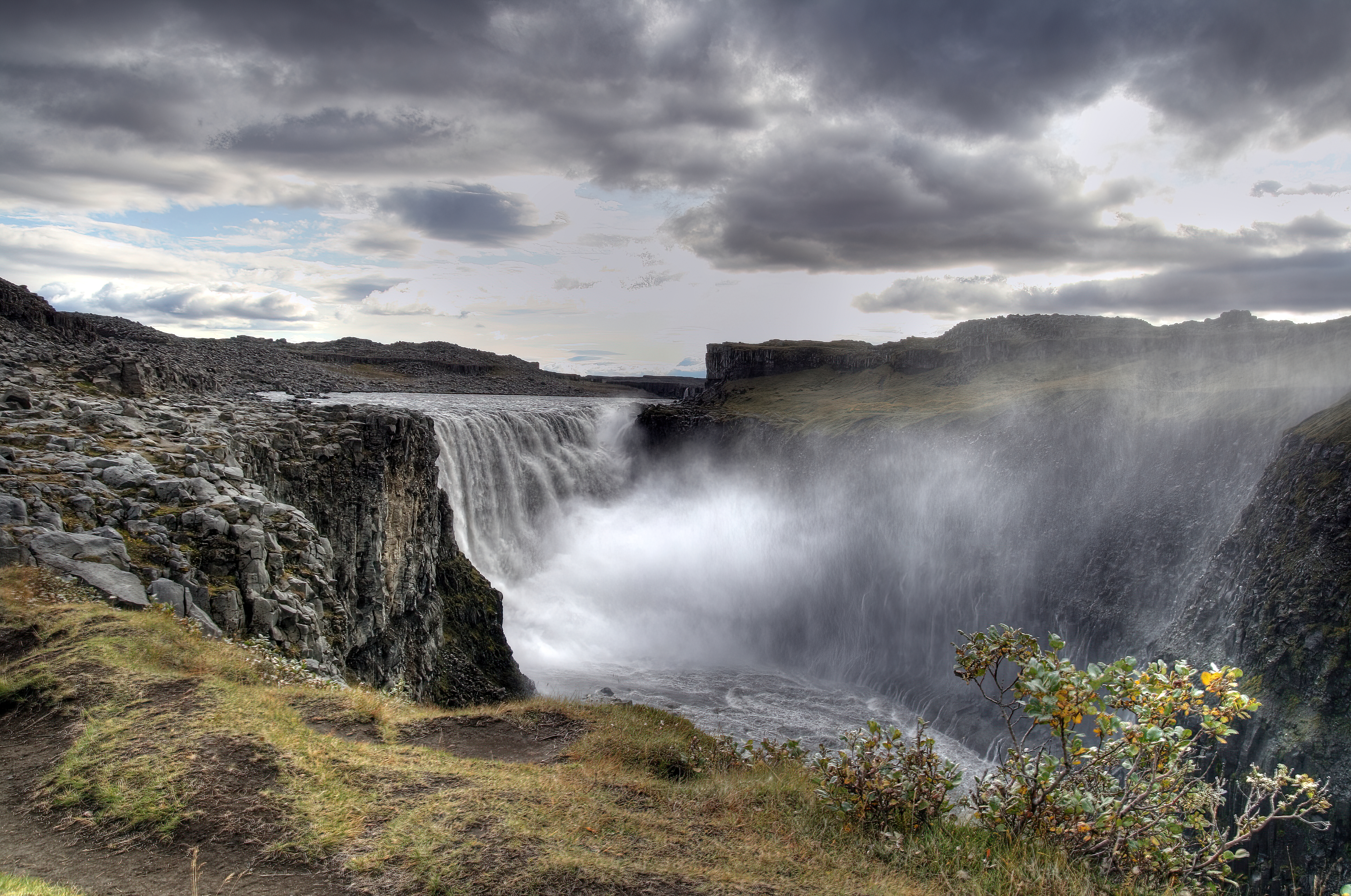
Dettifoss Waterfall is one of the most popular attractions on the Diamond Circle in North Iceland.

The Diamond Circle (Icelandic: Demantshringurinn [ˈtɛːman(t)sˌr̥iŋkʏrɪn]) is a popular tourist route around Húsavík and Lake Mývatn in North Iceland. The route is fully paved and easily accessible during the summer. The southern section of the route follows Route 1 (Ring road) from Akureyri, before turning north along Route 862, the new road to Dettifoss. Then it joins Route 85 at Ásbyrgi Canyon and follows the coast through Húsavík and eventually re-joining Route 1.

The four primary stops on the route are the town of Húsavík, Ásbyrgi Canyon, Lake Mývatn and Dettifoss Waterfall, the most powerful waterfall in Europe.

Other stops include Vatnajökull National Park, Goðafoss Waterfall, Dimmuborgir (Dark Castles), Eider Falls, The Whispering Cliffs and Laugar. The Diamond Circle covers an area rich in volcanic and geothermal features.

The completion of the 55-km new paved road to Dettifoss, Route 862, replaced a difficult old gravel road which was impassable during winter. The road was opened in stages from 2010 to 2021. This represented the last paved section of the Diamond Circle to be completed, linking the Route 1 and Route 85 by Ásbyrgi Canyon. This made the route from Dettifoss to Ásbyrgi canyon much more accessible, especially during winter.

The Diamond Circle Society is a non-profit organization that works to promote and protect the Diamond Circle and surrounding areas in North Iceland.

== See also ==
- Golden Circle (Iceland)
