= Húsavík =

- Town
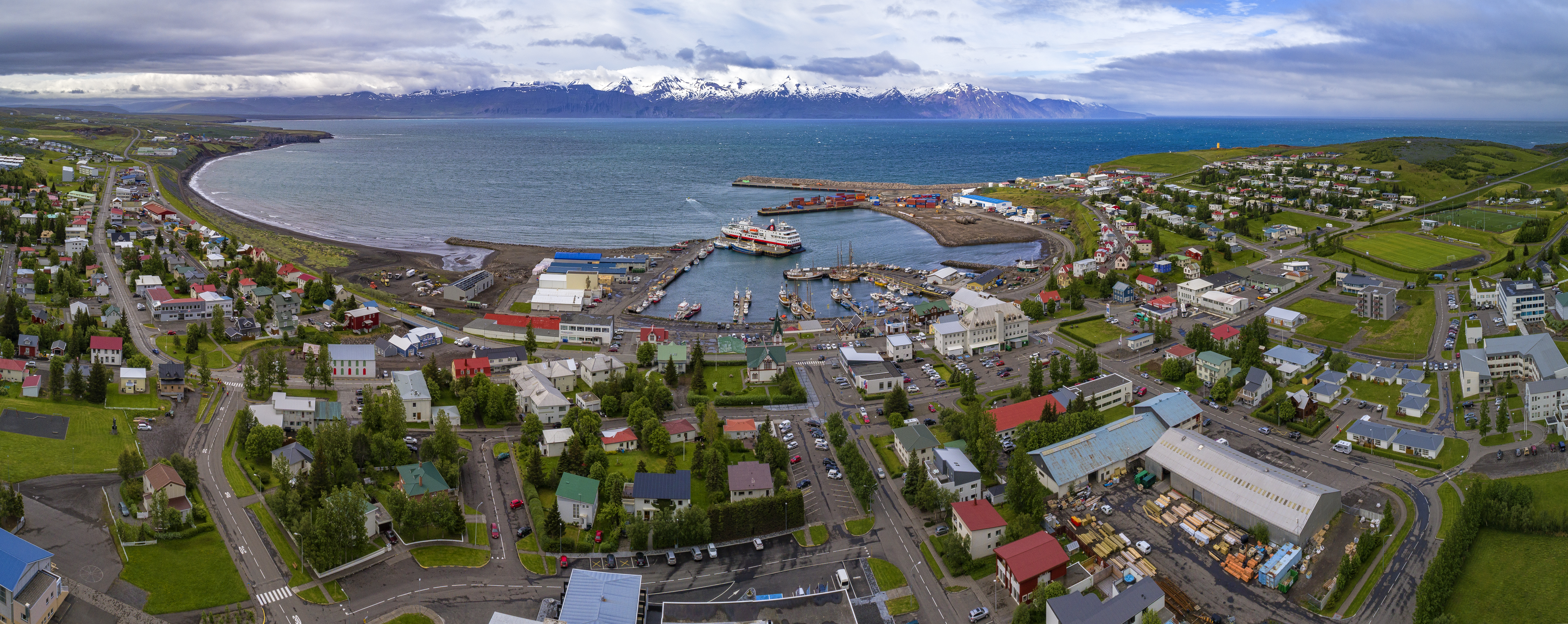
- Aerial panorama of the town and the harbour

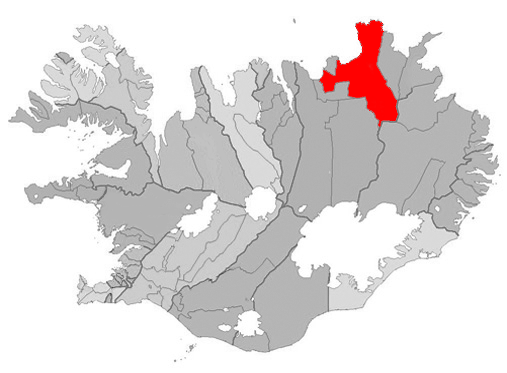
- Location of the Municipality of Norðurþing

- Location in Iceland
- Coordinates: 66°03′N 17°19′W
- Country: Iceland
- Constituency: Northeast Constituency
- Region: Northeastern Region
- Municipality: Norðurþing

Government
  - Mayor: Katrín Sigurjónsdóttir

Population (2018)
  - Total: 2,307
- Time zone: UTC+0 (GMT)
- Post Code: 640
- Website: Official website

Húsavík (Icelandic pronunciation: [ˈhuːsaˌviːk]) is a town in Norðurþing municipality on the northeast coast of Iceland on the shores of Skjálfandi bay with 2,485 inhabitants. The most famous landmark of the town is the wooden church Húsavíkurkirkja, built in 1907. Húsavík is served by Húsavík Airport.

== Overview ==
Here income is derived from tourism and fishing, as well as from retail and small industries. Until 2004, Húsavík was the export harbour for silica that was extracted from nearby lake Mývatn.

According to the Landnámabók ("Book of Settlement"), Húsavík was the first place in Iceland to be settled in by a Norseman. The Swedish Viking Garðar Svavarsson stayed there for one winter around 870 A.D. When he left the island in spring of 870, after a winter's stay, he left behind a man named Náttfari and two slaves, a man and a woman, and they established a farm there. The name of the town means "bay of houses", probably referring to Garðar's homestead, which was probably the only houses then in Iceland.

== Tourism ==
Húsavík has become a centre of whale watching in Iceland due to whales of different species that frequently enter the bay. The Húsavík Whale Museum is located in the town centre by the harbour.

In the town there is also a civic museum of culture and biology. Among other things, it shows a stuffed polar bear (arrived in Grímsey in 1969) and ancient boats.

Each year in mid July, Húsavík holds a festival called Mærudagar [ˈmaiːrʏˌtaːɣar̥], which translates to “Candy Days”. Thousands of people from all over Iceland come to the tiny town to enjoy this occasion which consists of music, colourful decorations, and an array of food and drink.

Húsavík is also home to The Exploration Museum, a museum of the history of human exploration. A monument honouring the Apollo astronauts who got trained up around Húsavík during the 1960s is located outside the museum.

The Eurovision Museum, dedicated to the Eurovision Song Contest, had its soft opening in October 2021, with the official grand opening in 2022.

The region of Mývatn, with its interesting geology and diverse animal life, is nearby. Jökulsárgljúfur National Park with the horseshoe-shaped canyon Ásbyrgi and the waterfalls Dettifoss, Hafragilsfoss and Selfoss are also not far from the town.

Húsavík Airport is located close to the town. Until 2024, there were regular flights to Reykjavík Airport. The Vaðlaheiðargöng tunnel opened in 2019 which shortened the travel time to Akureyri to within an hour. Flights from Húsavík Airport have therefore ceased.

== Sports ==
ÍF Völsungur is the local football club. They last played in Iceland's top tier in the 1988 season. The town also offers many opportunities for recreational sports. A 9 hole golf course, hiking and walking paths, two gym facilities and an outdoor public swimming pool.

== Popular culture ==
Húsavík served as the setting of the 2020 Netflix film Eurovision Song Contest: The Story of Fire Saga, a comedic story of two Húsavík natives representing Iceland in the Eurovision Song Contest, with one of the film's songs named after the town. The song itself was nominated for the Academy Award for Best Original Song at the 93rd Academy Awards.

The song's taped Best Original Song performance was filmed on location in Húsavík. In a break with Oscar tradition, all five songs had their performances pre-taped due to the COVID-19 pandemic instead of being performed live. "Húsavík" was the only one of the five nominated songs to have its pre-taped performance taking place outside of the United States.

On 25 April 2021, the performance was aired along with pre-taped performances of the other four nominated songs in that year's category. All five song performances were shown during the red carpet pre-show special that took place just before the main ceremony began.

Residents of the town reported a significant jump in tourism following the film's release. In 2021, The Eurovision Museum opened in Húsavík telling the story of the song contest and the film.

== International relations ==
=== Twin towns – Sister cities ===
- Karlskoga, Sweden
- Fredrikstad, Norway
- Riihimäki, Finland
- Aalborg, Denmark
- Qeqertarsuaq, Greenland
- Fuglafjørður, Faroe Islands
- Eastport, Maine, USA

== Climate ==
Húsavík has either a warm-summer humid continental climate (Köppen: Dfb) or an oceanic climate (Köppen: Cfb) depending on the isotherm used, −3 °C (27 °F) or 0 °C (32 °F), similar to much of coastal Iceland.

Climate data for Húsavík (2000–2019)
Month	Jan	Feb	Mar	Apr	May	Jun	Jul	Aug	Sep	Oct	Nov	Dec	Year
Record high °C (°F)	13.1 (55.6)	17.2 (63.0)	19.0 (66.2)	20.0 (68.0)	23.5 (74.3)	26.7 (80.1)	28.3 (82.9)	27.6 (81.7)	22.4 (72.3)	19.0 (66.2)	19.0 (66.2)	15.8 (60.4)	28.3 (82.9)
Mean daily maximum °C (°F)	1.3 (34.3)	1.6 (34.9)	1.4 (34.5)	5.9 (42.6)	10.7 (51.3)	13.8 (56.8)	14.3 (57.7)	13.6 (56.5)	10.8 (51.4)	6.3 (43.3)	2.6 (36.7)	1.4 (34.5)	7.0 (44.5)
Daily mean °C (°F)	−1.1 (30.0)	−0.3 (31.5)	1.0 (33.8)	2.9 (37.2)	6.9 (44.4)	11.3 (52.3)	13.1 (55.6)	12.4 (54.3)	10.2 (50.4)	5.4 (41.7)	2.0 (35.6)	0.7 (33.3)	5.4 (41.7)
Mean daily minimum °C (°F)	−4.2 (24.4)	−3.7 (25.3)	−4.0 (24.8)	−1.6 (29.1)	1.9 (35.4)	5.4 (41.7)	7.2 (45.0)	6.9 (44.4)	3.8 (38.8)	1.0 (33.8)	−2.3 (27.9)	−4.0 (24.8)	0.5 (32.9)
Record low °C (°F)	−18.0 (−0.4)	−16.5 (2.3)	−21.2 (−6.2)	−17.4 (0.7)	−9.8 (14.4)	−3.5 (25.7)	0.5 (32.9)	0.3 (32.5)	−5.8 (21.6)	−10.2 (13.6)	−15.0 (5.0)	−17.5 (0.5)	−21.2 (−6.2)
Average precipitation mm (inches)	78.6 (3.09)	60.2 (2.37)	62.7 (2.47)	50.4 (1.98)	37.2 (1.46)	42.0 (1.65)	43.3 (1.70)	58.2 (2.29)	90.1 (3.55)	101.4 (3.99)	87.3 (3.44)	77.1 (3.04)	788.5 (31.03)
Source: Icelandic Met Office

== Daylight hours ==
Húsavík experiences midnight sun from 11 June until 29 June.

Although Húsavík doesn't experience polar night in December solstice, the shortest daylight hours in Húsavík are 2 hours 45 minutes, from 11:45 UTC until 14:30 UTC on 21 December.

== Notable persons ==
=== Miss World ===
Linda Pétursdóttir, Miss World 1988.

== Gallery ==
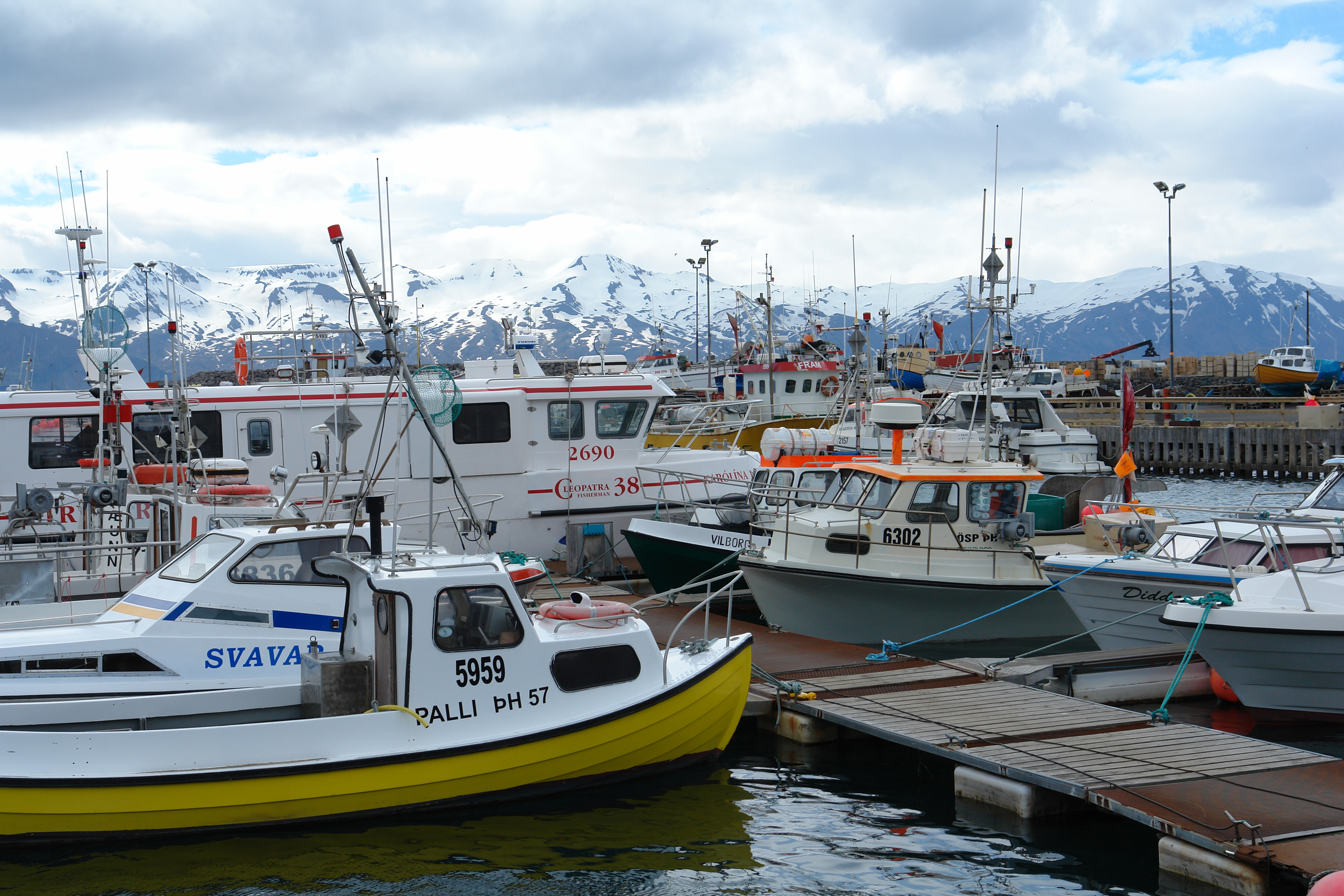
Húsavík harbour

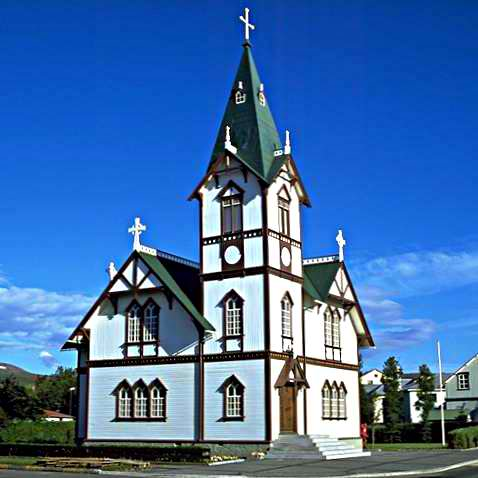
Church of Húsavík, Húsavíkurkirkja

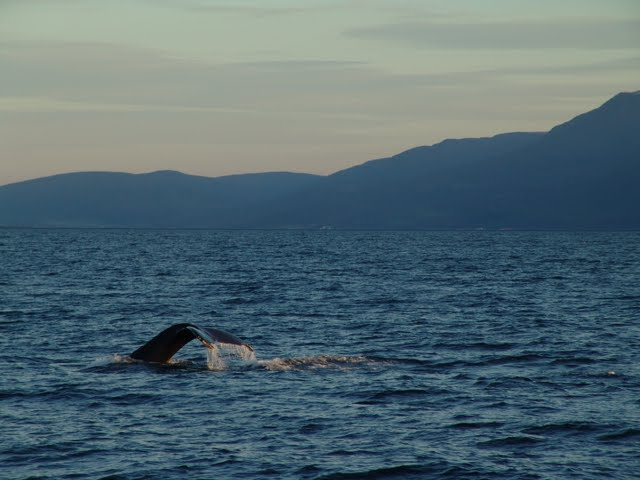
Whales in Skjalfandi near Húsavík

== See also ==
- History of Iceland
- Húsavík Chamber of Commerce and Tourism
- List of cities and towns in Iceland
- Volcanism of Iceland
