= Hafragilsfoss =

Coordinates: 65°49′57″N 16°24′00″W

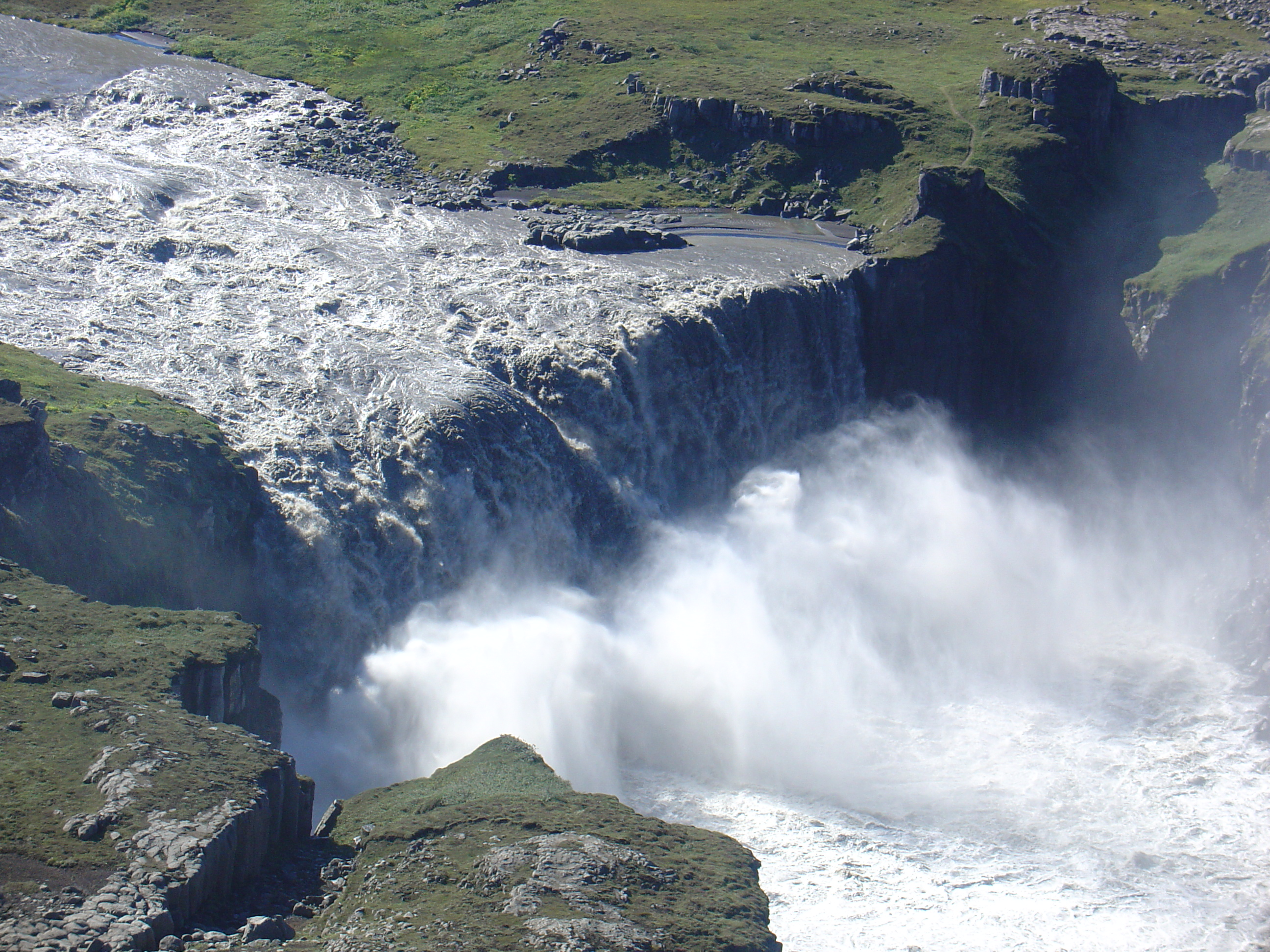
- Hafragilsfoss waterfall, seen from the observation point
- Location: North of Iceland
- Total height: 27 m (89 ft)
- Number of drops: 1
- Total width: 91 m (299 ft)

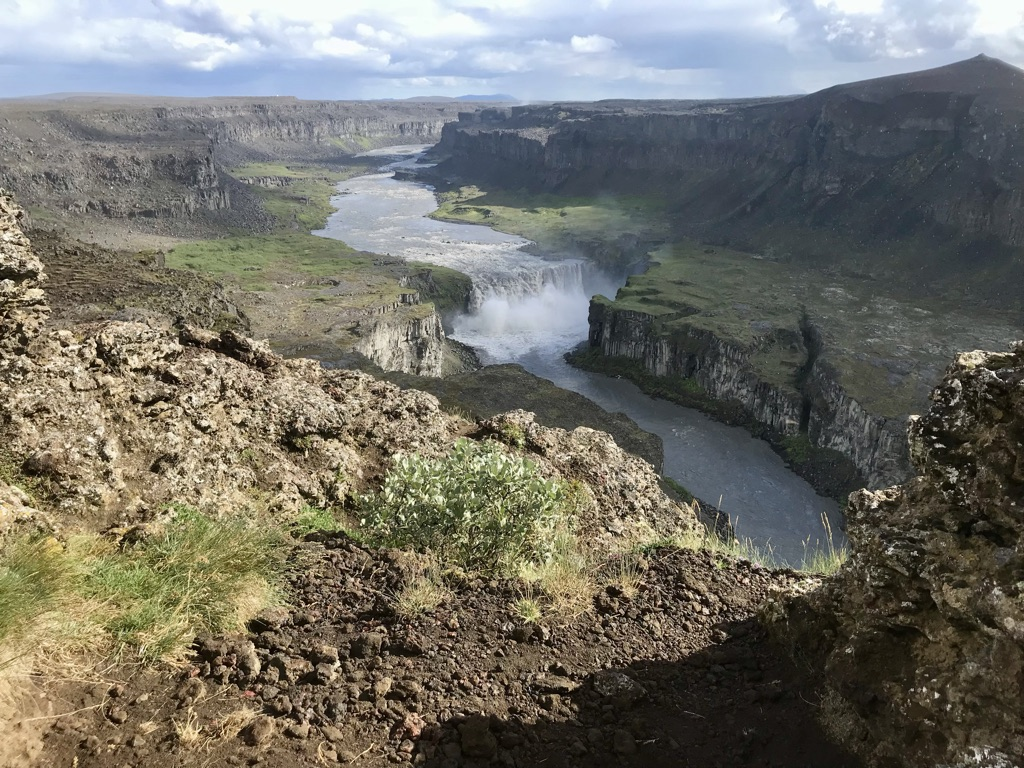
Hafragilsfoss Waterfall, from upper view

Hafragilsfoss (Icelandic pronunciation: [ˈhavraˌcɪlsˌfɔsː]) is a waterfall in Iceland.

The waterfall flows downstream from Dettifoss within the depths of the Jökulságljúfur canyon. This waterfall is also on the glacial river Jökulsá á Fjöllum, making it a powerful waterfall. The falls are visible from both sides of the river.

The waterfall has a single drop of 27 m (89 ft) and has an average width of 91 m (299 ft).

== See also ==
- List of waterfalls
- List of waterfalls in Iceland
