= Sigurður Pálsson =

Icelandic writer (1948–2017)

Sigurður Pálsson (born Skinnastaður, 30 July 1948 – 19 September 2017) was an Icelandic poet, author and translator. He worked primarily in cinema and television, theatre, and university teaching. He is particularly noted, among Icelandic writers, for his close links with France.

== Biography ==
Sigurður grew up in the north-east of Iceland. He died of illness in 2017.

=== Education ===
Sigurður graduated from Menntaskólinn í Reykjavík in 1967, having been taught French by, amongst others, Vigdís Finnbogadóttir; and then, at the age of 19, proceeded to France. He studied French from 1967–68 in Paris and Toulouse, before taking a Diplôme universitaire d'études littéraires and the first part of an MA at University of Paris III: Sorbonne Nouvelle and studying cinema at the Conservatoire libre du cinéma français.

In 1978-82, Sigurður returned to the Sorbonne to complete his MA and take a DEA. He also studied film directing at the Conservatoire Libre du Cinéma Français.

=== Artistic career ===
Sigurður was in France during the May 1968 revolts, which influenced his intellectual and literary evolution.

During the 1970s, Sigurður Pálsson was part of a group of young Icelandic poets, the Listaskáldin vondu, who worked to renew Icelandic literary language by combining colloquial language with traditional influences; the group also included Steinunn Sigurðardóttir, Pétur Gunnarsson and Þórarinn Eldjárn. In 1975, he published the collection Ljóð vega salt, which deployed autobiographical elements to probe contemporary life.

From the 1980s onwards, he published collections of poems, a number of novels, ten or so plays, and twenty or so translations, mostly from French.

He has also taught at the University of Iceland and the Iceland Academy of the Arts.

=== Awards and honours ===
Sigurður was made a knight of the Ordre des Arts et des Lettres in 1990 and of the Ordre du Mérite in 2007. He was artist in residence in Reykjavík in 1987–90.

In 2007 his memoirs, Minnisbók, won the Icelandic Literary Award.

He won the Jónas Hallgrímsson Award on Icelandic Language Day in 2016 and on New Year's Day 2017 he was made a knight of the Icelandic Order of the Falcon for his services to Icelandic literature and culture.

== Oevre ==
Among Sigurður's main works are:

- 1975: Ljóð vega salt
- 1980: Ljóð vega menn (Reykjavik: Mál og menning)
- 1982: Ljóð vega gerd (Reykjavik: Iðunn)
- 1990: Ljóð námu völd (Reykjavik: Forlagið)
- 1993: Ljóð línu (Reykjavik: Forlagið)
- 1995: Ljóðlínuskip (Reykjavik: Forlagið)
- 1996: Ljóð vega safn (Reykjavik: Mál og menning)
- 1997: Ljóðlínuspil (Reykjavik: Forlagið)
- 1998: Parísarhjól (Reykjavik: Forlagið)
- 2002: Næturstaður (Reykjavik: JPV)
- 2002: Tattu (Tattoo), a comedy.
- 2007: Minnisbók (Reykjavik: JPV)
- 2009: Ljóðorkuþörf (Reykjavik: JPV)

Translations into English include:

- 2014: Inside Voices Outside Light, trans. by Martin S. Regal (Todmorden: Arc)

His poetry was translated into Irish for the 2012 Irish Leaving Certificate.
