= Selfoss (waterfall) =

Coordinates: 65°47′54″N 16°22′57″W

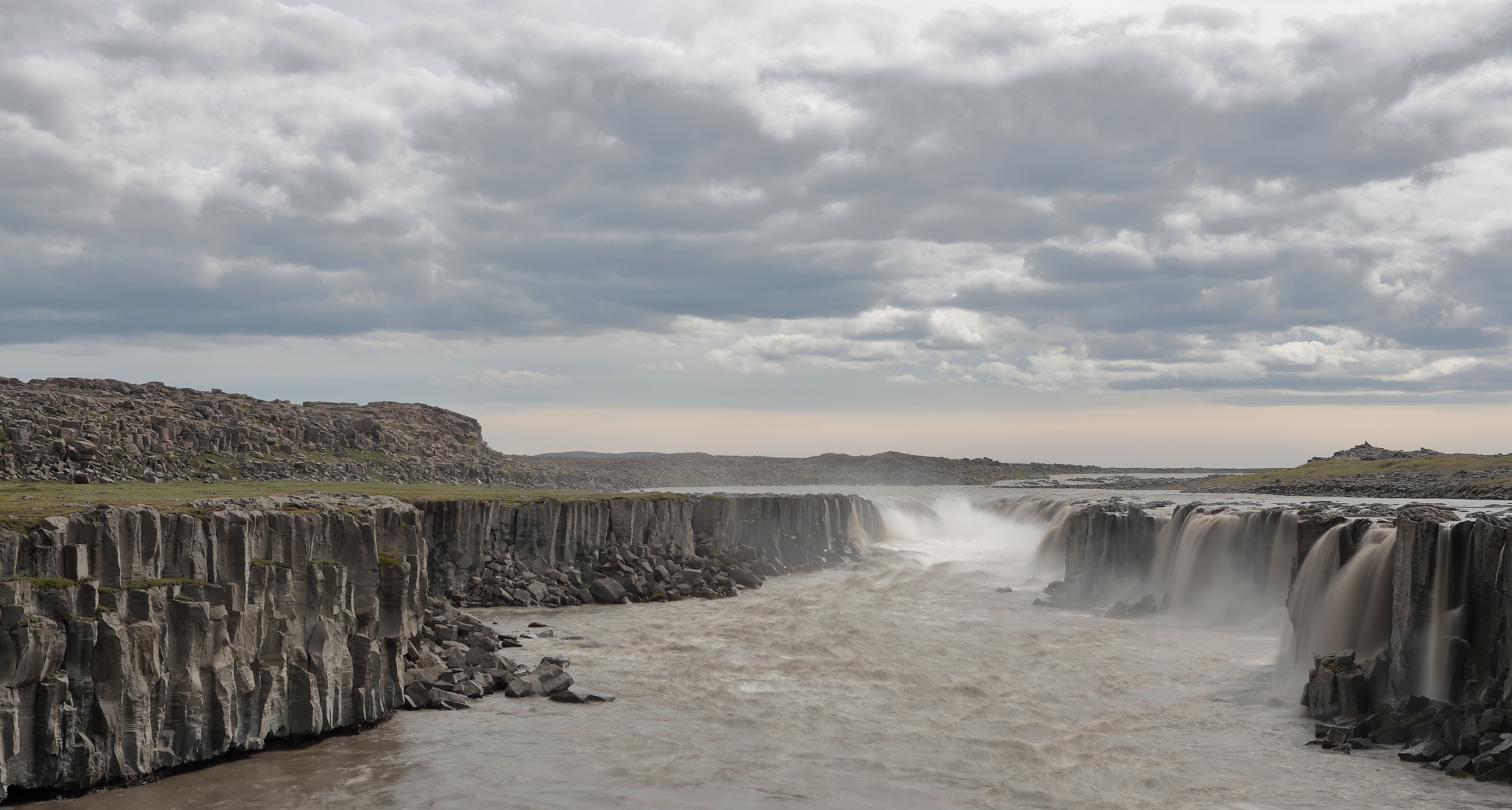
- Location: North of Iceland
- Total height: 11 m (36 ft)
- Watercourse: Jökulsá á Fjöllum

Selfoss (Icelandic pronunciation: [ˈsɛlˌfɔsː]) is a waterfall on the river Jökulsá á Fjöllum in the north of Iceland. The river drops over a number of waterfalls over about 30 km before flowing into Öxarfjörður, a bay of the Arctic Sea. The river originates as melt water from the glacier Vatnajökull and therefore the water flow varies depending on the season, the weather and volcanic activity.

A few hundred meters downstream of the 11 m (36 ft)-high waterfall is Dettifoss, the second-most powerful waterfall in Europe. Below the falls, the river passes through a gorge which is part of the Jökulsárgljúfur National Park.

== Gallery ==
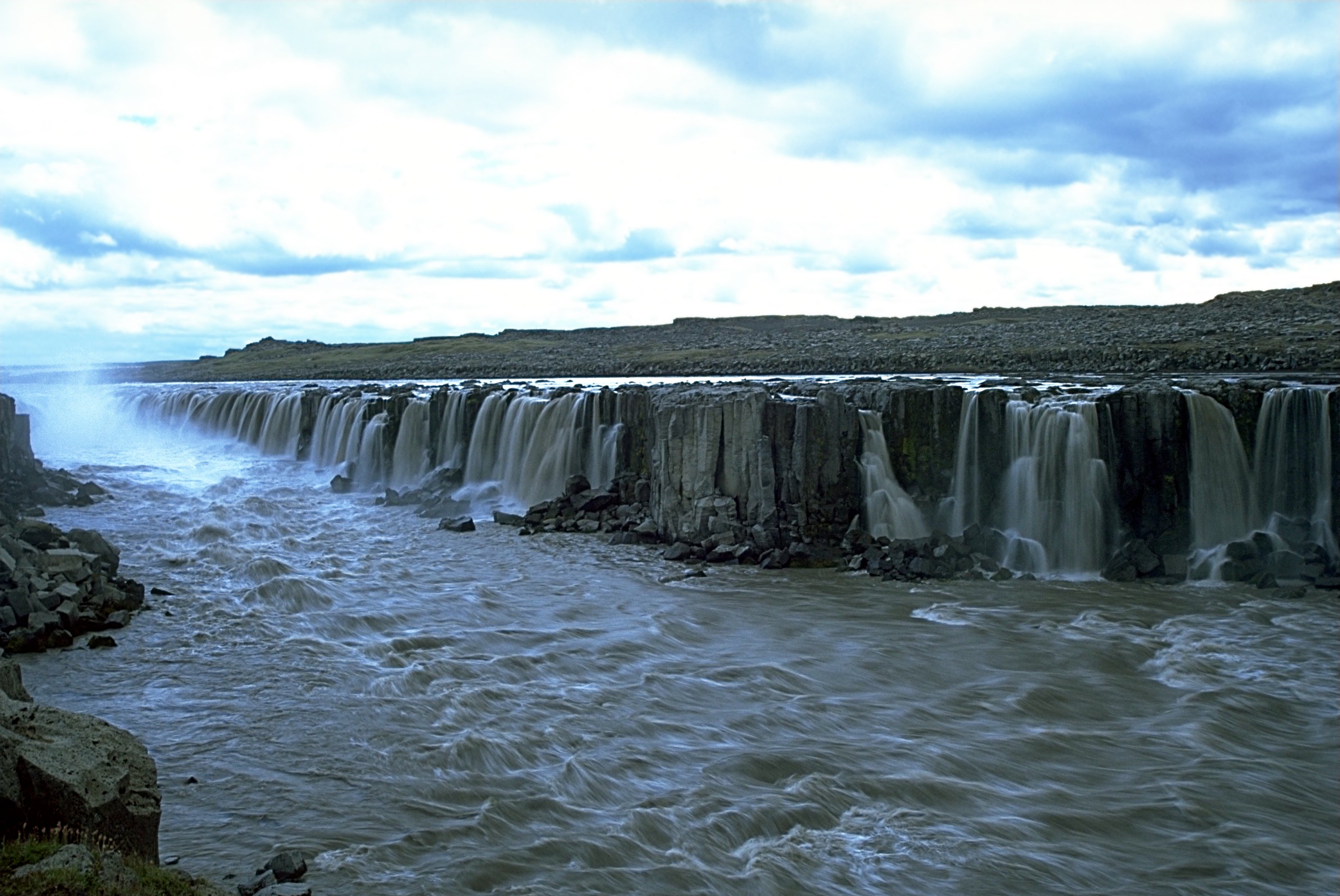

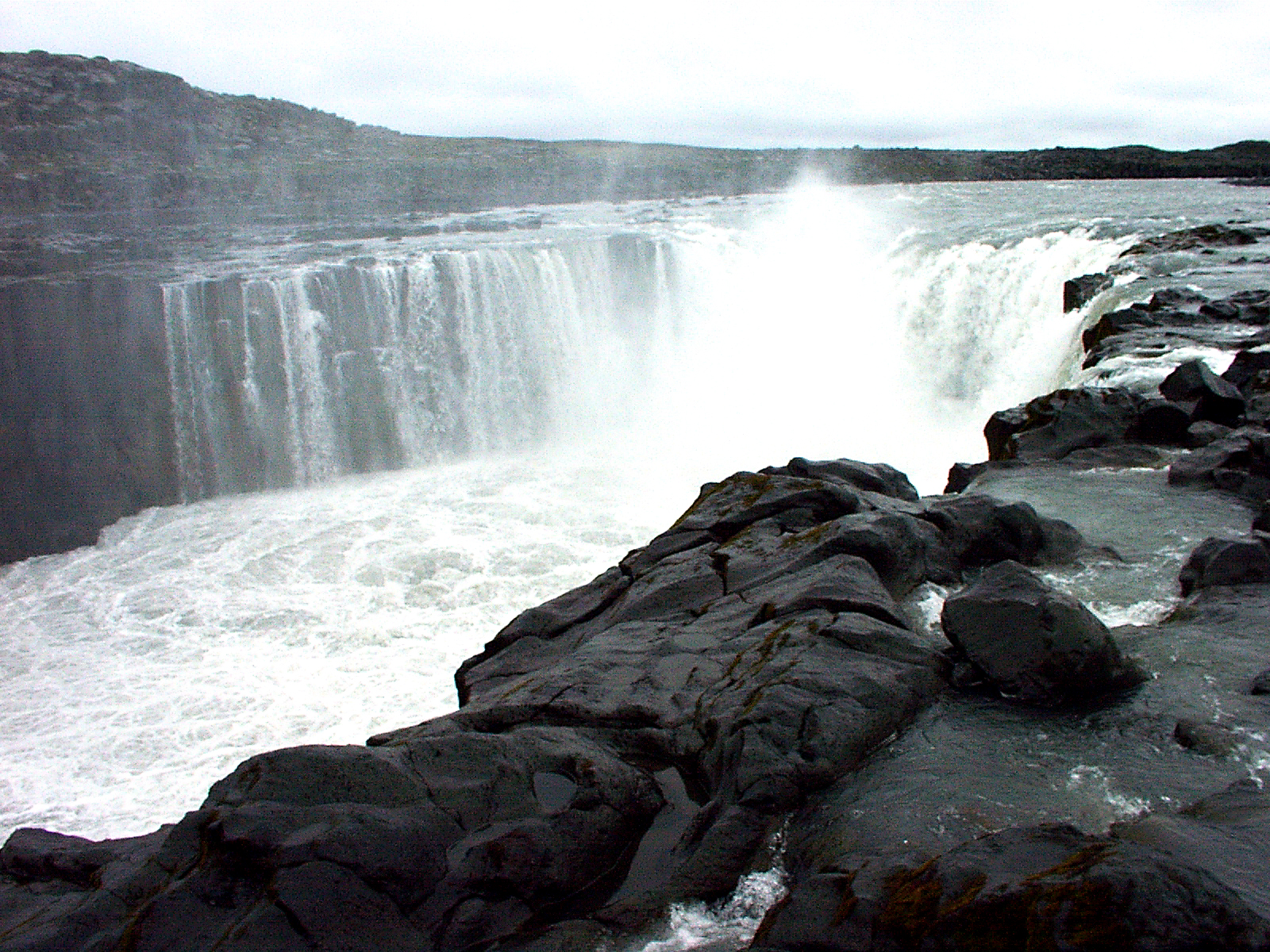

== See also ==
- Waterfalls of Iceland
- List of waterfalls
