= Víkingavatn =

Lake in Iceland

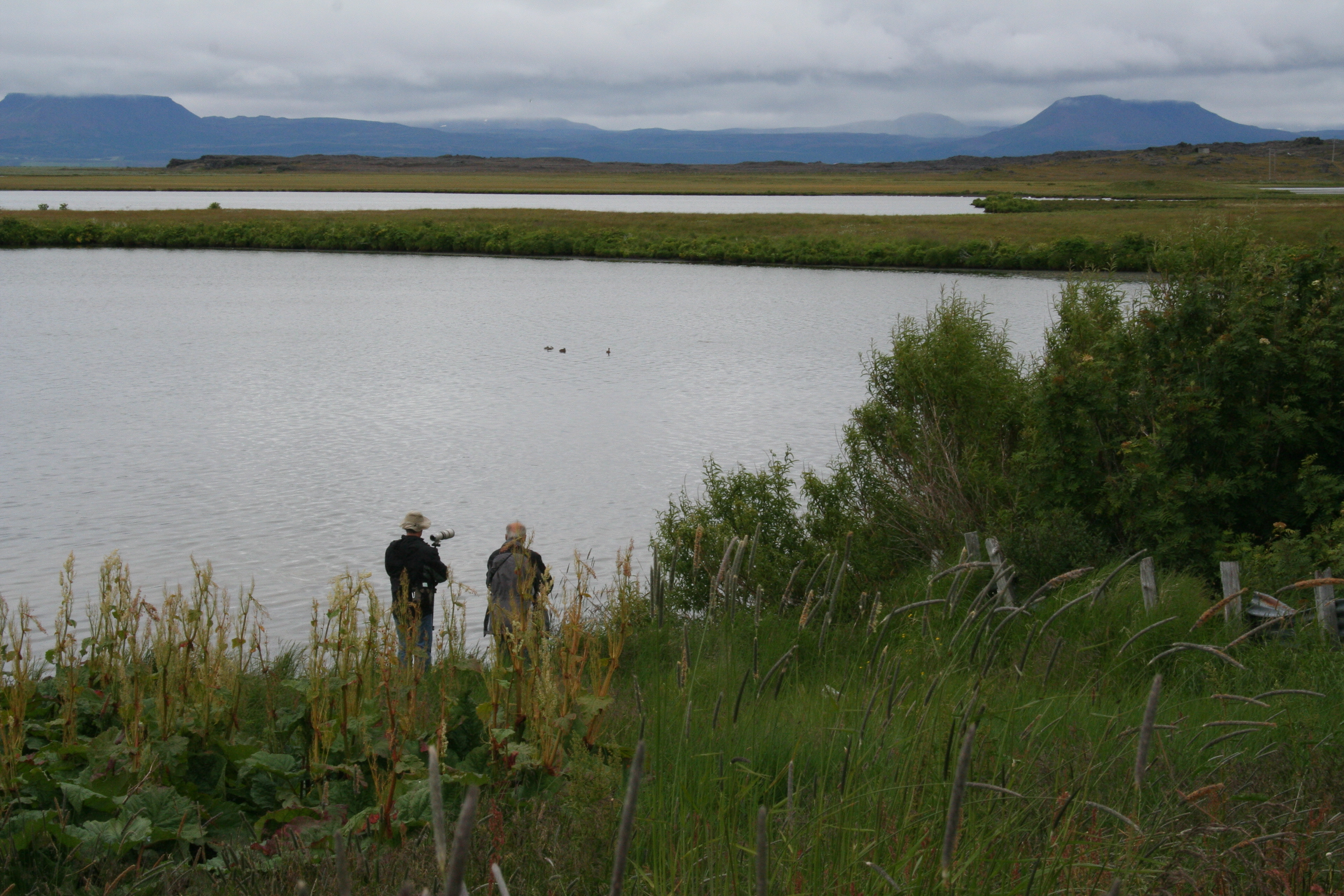

- Location within Iceland
- Coordinates: 66°10′N 16°59′W
- Surface area: 2.4 km^{2} (0.93 sq mi)

Víkingavatn (Icelandic pronunciation: [ˈviːciŋkaˌvahtn̥]) is a shallow lake situated in the north of Iceland, between Húsavík and Ásbyrgi. Lake Vikingavatn is also called Little Lake Myvatn because of the abundance of nesting duck species and other birds. Vikingavatn has an area of 2,4 km^{2}. It is only 4 m above sea level. Vikingavatn was an estate in the past and originally owned by a farmer by the name "Vikingur".
