= Húsavík Whale Museum =

Museum in Iceland

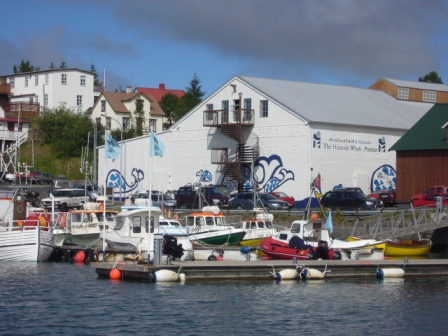
- Established: 1997
- Location: Húsavík, Iceland
- Type: Natural history

The Húsavík Whale Museum is a non-profit organization established in 1997. The Húsavík Whale Museum is situated in Húsavík, a small town in north east Iceland, on the shores of Skjálfandi Bay, just below the Arctic Circle at 66° N. It began as a small exhibit on whales in the town's hotel in summer 1997. Shortly after that, the exhibition was moved into the newly renovated part of the baiting shed at the harbor and the shareholding business “Húsavík Whale Centre ehf” was established. Due to the growing popularity, it was obvious that a larger and more suitable building was needed after only 3 years. In 2000, the town's old slaughterhouse (built in 1931 and abandoned in the 1980s) was purchased, remodeled, and officially opened in June 2002. In 2004, the shareholding business turned into a non-profit organization and was renamed “The Húsavík Whale Museum.” By 2005, a comprehensive exhibition on the ecology of whales was added.

== Museum ==
The museum's purpose is to educate the public about whales, with emphasis on the species occurring in the North Atlantic. The exhibition provides informative and attractive displays that have the capacity to raise awareness about cetaceans and their environment. The scientific component includes an introduction to the museum's research, which has been expanding since 2001 and now includes international collaborations and publications. The museum was acknowledged as an educational facility by the Icelandic Ministry of Education in 2007.

=== Exhibition area ===
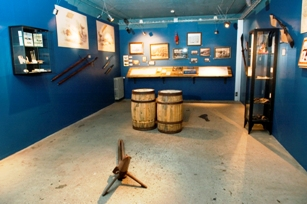
Interior of the Whale Museum

The Whale Museum offers 1.600 m^{2} of exhibition area displayed on two stories. Special attention is given to the manner in which information is presented. Exhibits often reveal the work and creative input of many staff members throughout the museum's history. Illustrations and interactive exhibits accompany the texts to captivate the imagination of visitors and encourage further reading. The lower floor hosts a section on marine ecosystems, introducing visitors to the habitat and ecology of whales. Additional exhibits describe the cetacean species in the North Atlantic and their natural history, strandings, whale watching and past/present Icelandic whaling. Further information can be found on dolphins with emphasis on the most common species in Icelandic waters. Special attention is given to orcas, including the most famous Icelandic orca, Keiko. Two documentaries about whaling and the conflict between whaling and whale watching are offered to give visitors an introduction to the issue. The museum's upper floor contains the “whale gallery” with authentic skeletons of 9 species. The first skeleton assembled was a Sowerby's beaked whale (Mesoplodon bidens) in 1998, followed by the minke whale (Balaenoptera acutorostrata) and the sperm whale (Physeter macrocephalus). Other species added were the humpback whale (Megaptera novaeangliae), orca (Orcinus orca), Cuvier's beaked whale (Ziphius cavirostris), northern bottlenose whale (Hyperoodon ampullatus), and long-finned pilot whale (Globicephala melas). In 2004, the remarkable skeleton of a narwhal (Monodon monoceros) was donated to the museum from Greenland.

=== Volunteer program ===
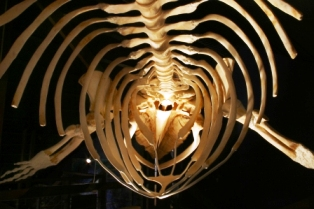
Whale skeleton

From the start, the museum has hosted an international volunteer program, which at the time was rather uncommon in Iceland. Participants in the volunteer program have mostly been students of biology or related topics. The volunteers are invaluable to daily operation of the museum and ensure that it can sustain the extended hours of operation during the summer season. The volunteers provide translations of texts, work towards the improvement of exhibits, and take part in the museum's research program. Volunteers gain the opportunity to learn more about the whales, and experience them in their natural environment. They quickly become capable of providing guests with a professional guiding through the museum and can often educate visitors in a number of languages. The Volunteers participate in the museum's whale research that has been performed for several years. The volunteers take one trip per day in the whale boats, collecting the data needed for the research program. The museum's database is constantly updated and used by researchers for further studies.

== Whale research ==
Research at the Whale Museum began in 1998, but the data collected had been given to another institution. Several years later, the museum decided to establish its own database. In agreement with a local whale watching company called North Sailing, the museum staff has the opportunity to collect data in the field each summer. The museum collaborates with both universities and researchers. To date, the research program has focused mainly on photo identification, but also on habitat studies and cetacean respiration patterns.
