= The Eurovision Museum =

The Húsavík Eurovision Song Contest Exhibition
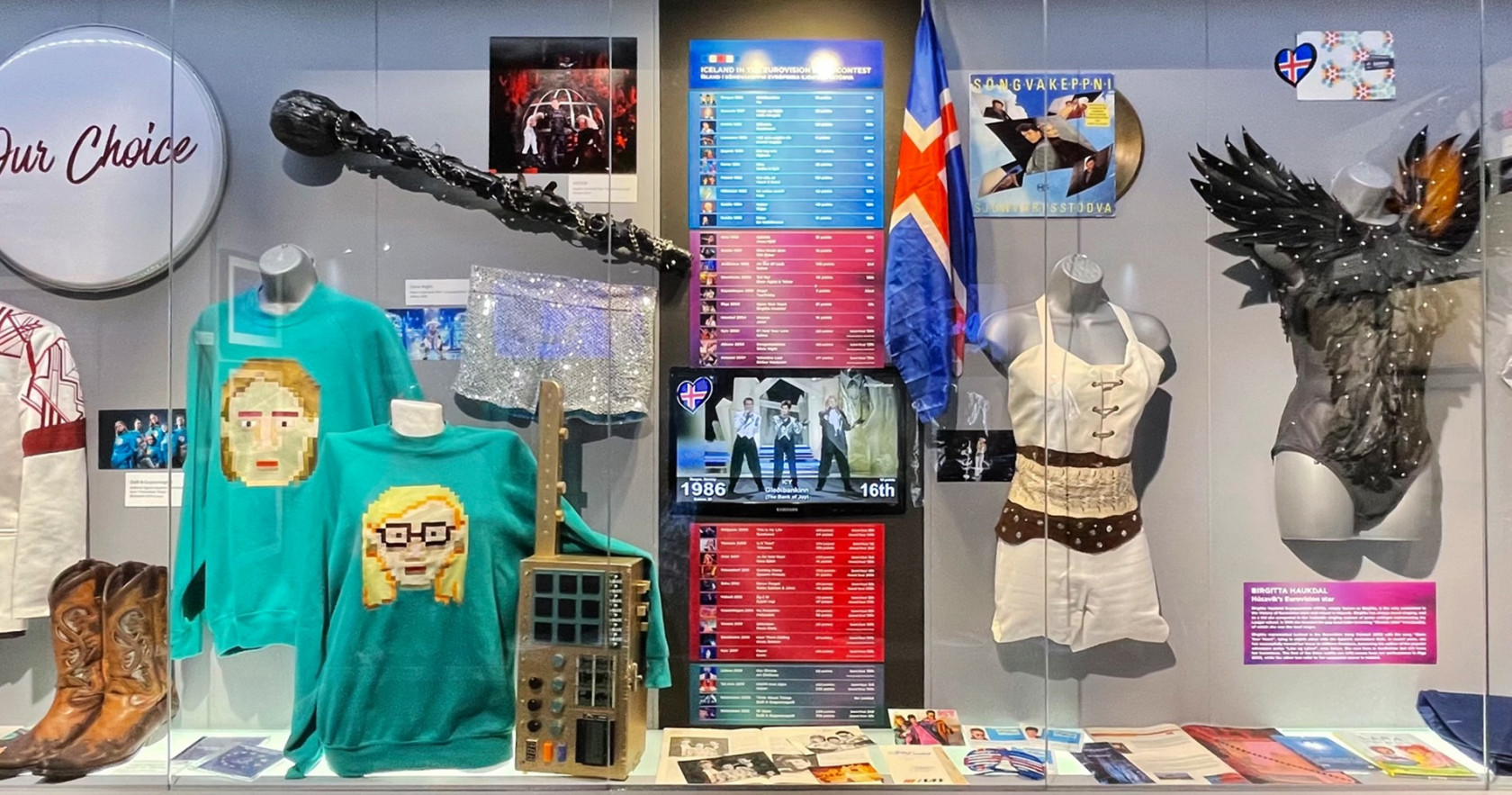

- Location within Iceland
- Established: 15 October 2021
- Location: Húsavík Cape Hotel, Húsavík, Iceland
- Coordinates: 66.0484737°N 17.3533425°W
- Type: Music museum
- Director: Orly Orlyson
- Website: www.eurovisionhusavik.com

The Húsavík Eurovision Song Contest Exhibition (commonly referred to as the Eurovision Museum) is a museum exhibition located on the ground floor of the Cape Hotel in the town of Húsavík, Iceland. The exhibition tells the story of the Eurovision Song Contest and of the 2020 Netflix film Eurovision Song Contest: The Story of Fire Saga, that was set and filmed in Húsavík.

The museum project was first announced in July 2020 by the Mayor of Húsavík during a radio interview following the release of the film. The museum is run by the local Exploration Museum with permission from the European Broadcasting Union and Netflix. It displays outfits and instruments from the song contest, as well as costumes and props from the film.

== Exhibitions ==
The museum consists of three main exhibition spaces. The first exhibition tells the story of Iceland in the Eurovision Song Contest, displaying the outfits of several of the country's contestants over the years. This included Iceland's first entry Gleðibankinn from 1986. The second exhibition tells the story of the Eurovision Song Contest and how it has defined Europe over 7 decades. The third exhibition space features props and costumes from the Netflix movie. In addition, a small space near the exit tells the story of Húsavík's campaign to win a 2021 Academy Award for a song featured in the film and named after the town.

== Gallery ==
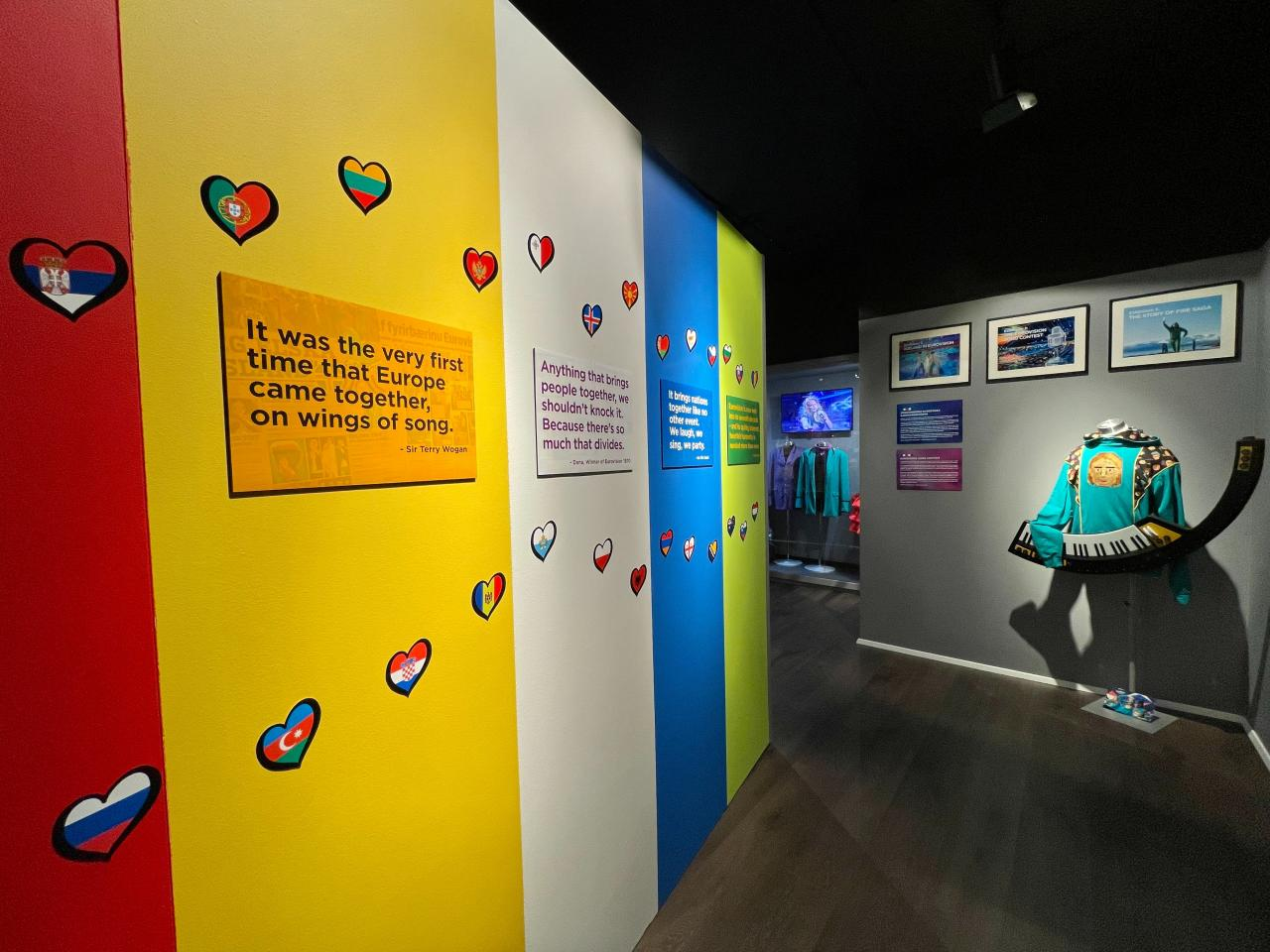
The entrance to the Eurovision Museum.

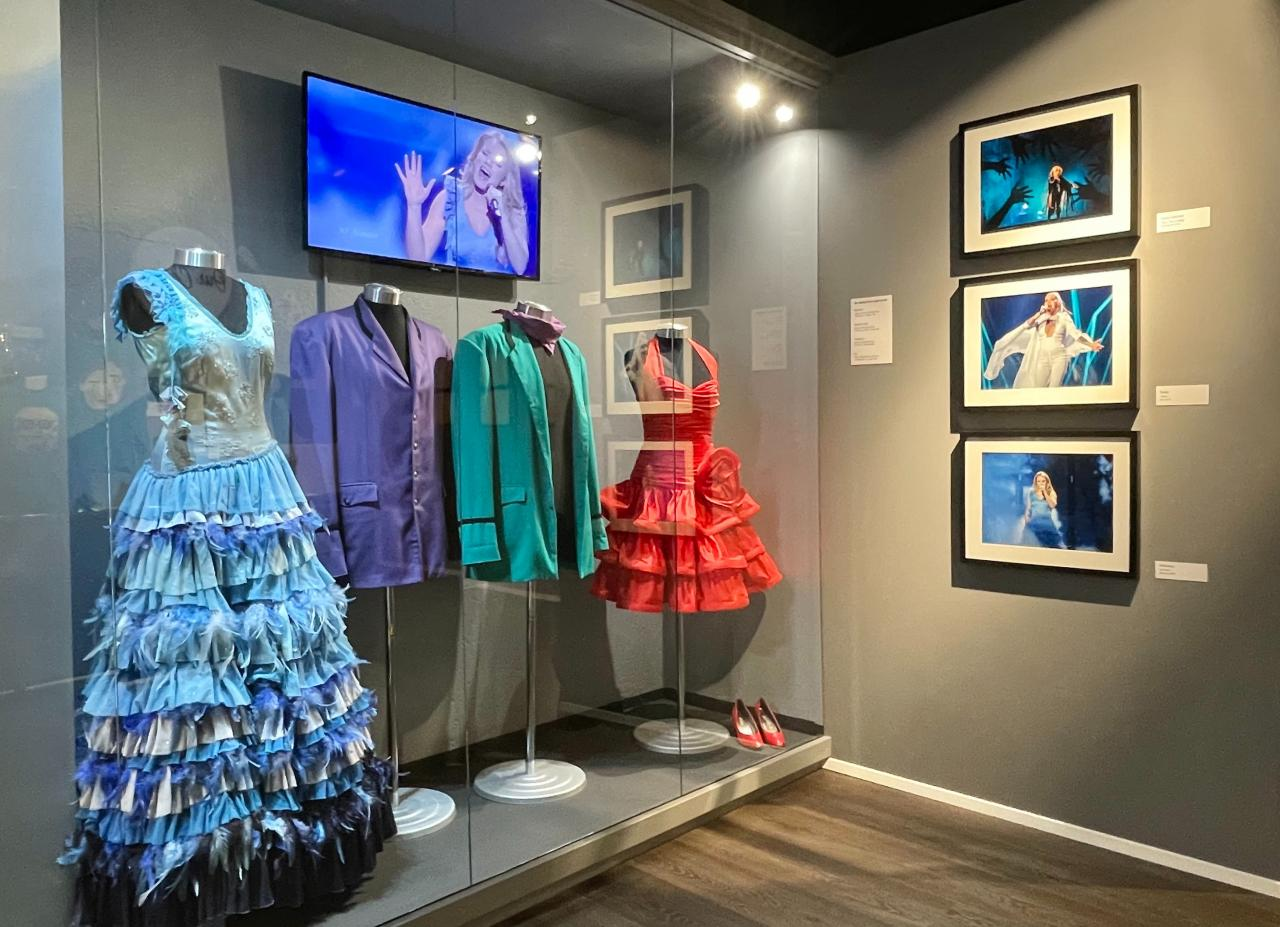
Glass display with dresses and jackets from the Eurovision Song Contest.

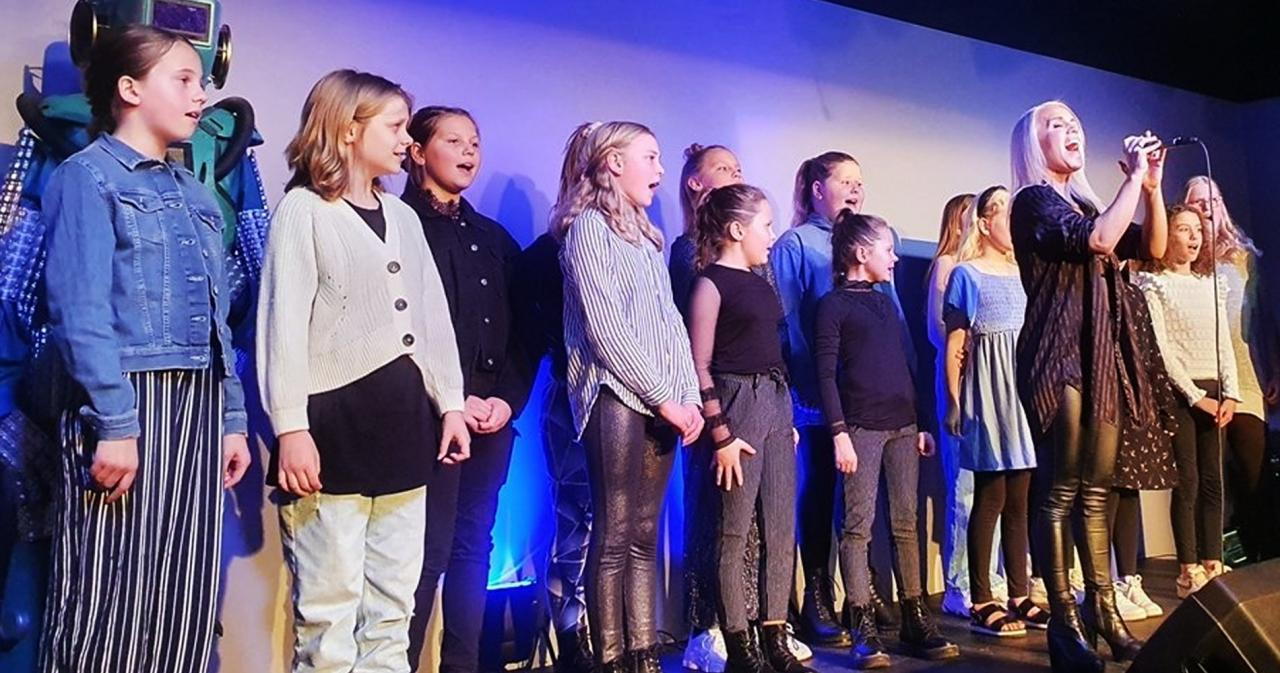
Greta Salóme performing with the Húsavík Oscar Choir at the museum opening.

== See also ==
- Eurovision Song Contest
- Eurovision Song Contest: The Story of Fire Saga
- European Broadcasting Union
