= Húsavík Chamber of Commerce and Tourism =

Chamber of commerce and tourism board for the town of Húsavík in North Iceland

The Húsavík Chamber of Commerce and Tourism
- Abbreviation: HCCT
- Formation: 2002
- Type: Chamber of Commerce and Tourism
- Location: Húsavík, Iceland
- Leader: [[]]
- Chairman: Helga Björg Sigurðardóttir
- Website: http://www.visithusavik.com/

The Húsavík Chamber of Commerce and Tourism (Icelandic: Markþing) is the chamber of commerce and tourism board for the town of Húsavík in North Iceland. The organization was established in 2002 and is based on voluntary participation by individuals and companies. The aim of the organization is to strengthen the local business community and promote the area for travelers.
