= Skinnastaður =

- Village
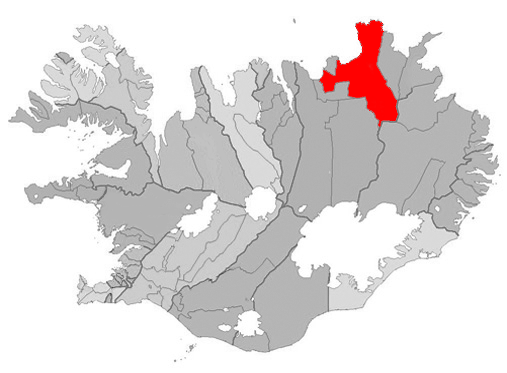
- Location of the Municipality of Norðurþing

- Location of Skinnastaður in Iceland
- Coordinates: 66°4′N 16°26′W
- Country: Iceland
- Constituency: Northeast Constituency
- Region: Northeastern Region
- Municipality: Norðurþing
- Time zone: UTC+0 (GMT)

Skinnastaður (Icelandic pronunciation: [ˈscɪnːaˌstaːðʏr̥]) is a farm and rectory in northeastern Iceland, north of Vatnajökull National Park and 25 km from Dettifoss. It is a part of the Norðurþing municipality.

The church, Skinnastaðarkirkja, is known for its ornate wooden structure.

The farm is the subject of a legend about the location involving cursed carolers; the story goes that the original farmstead and church sank into the earth one Christmas Eve.

There is a seismic station located at the farm that is used to forecast volcanic eruptions, especially from Hekla.

== See also ==
- Schäfflertanz - a festival in Munich celebrating cursed carolers
