= Eaton Canyon (disambiguation) =

Eaton Canyon typically refers to the canyon in the San Gabriel Mountains, California, United States.

It may also refer to:

- Eaton Canyon (New Mexico), in Socorro County, New Mexico
- Eaton Canyon (Quebec), on the Caniapiscau River, in Canada
