= Tjörnes =

Peninsula in northeast Iceland

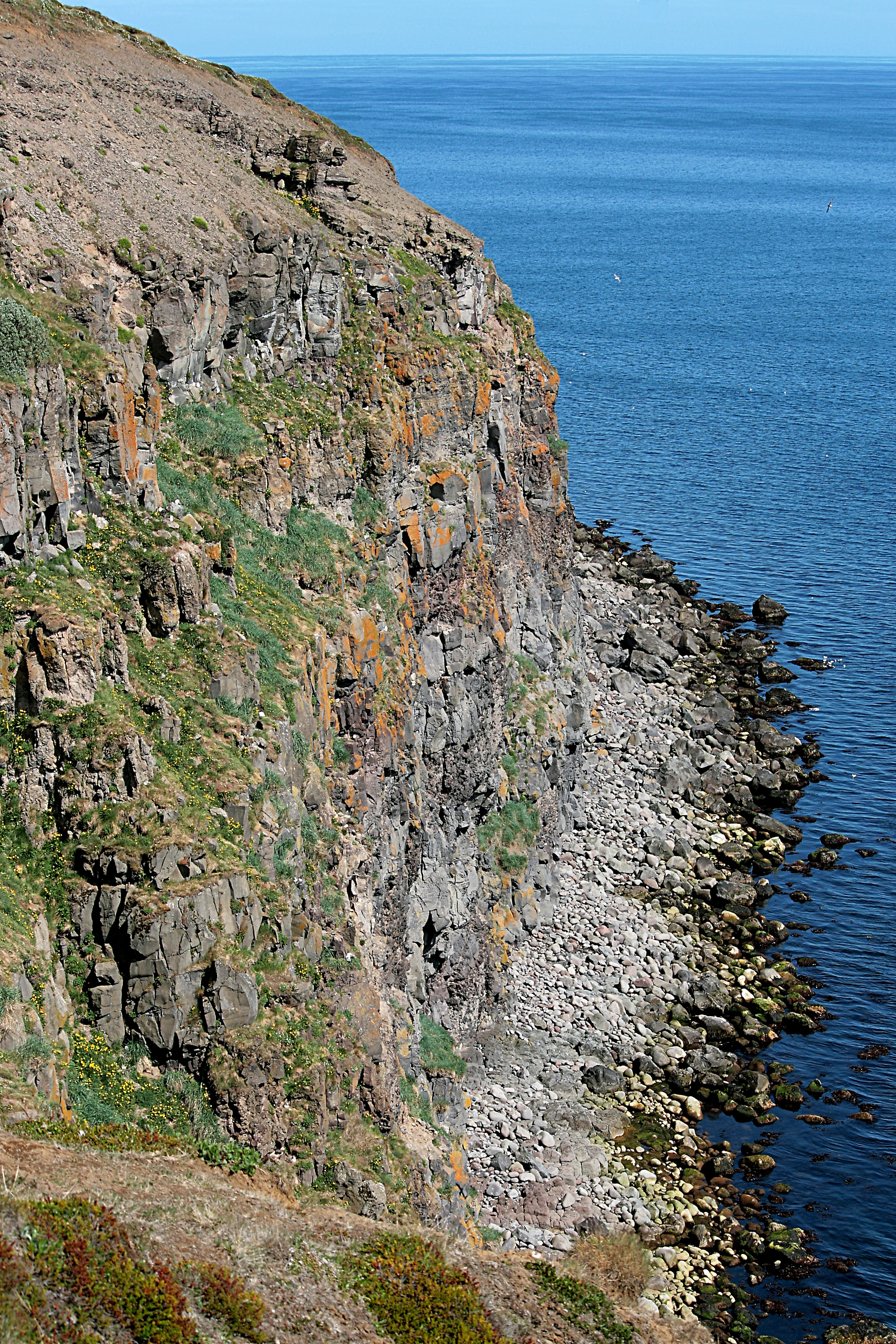
Tjörnes peninsula

Tjörnes (Icelandic pronunciation: [ˈtʰjœrˌnɛːs]) is a peninsula situated at the northeast of Iceland, between the fjords of Öxarfjörður and Skjálfandi. Tjörnes is known for its particularly dense population of Rock Ptarmigan and the rich fossil record of Miocene - Pliocene age.

== The submarine volcano ==
Tjornes Fracture Zone

Highest point
- Elevation: Below sea level
- Prominence: Below sea level
- Coordinates: 66.30°N 17.10°W

Geography
- Location: Atlantic Ocean north of Iceland

Geology
- Mountain type: Fissure vents
- Last eruption: 1867 to 1868

There is a submarine volcano north of Iceland named the Tjornes Fracture Zone. It is a series of underwater fissure vents that last erupted in 1868.
