= Jökulsá á Fjöllum =

River in Iceland

Coordinates: 64°39′52.54″N 16°51′17.33″W

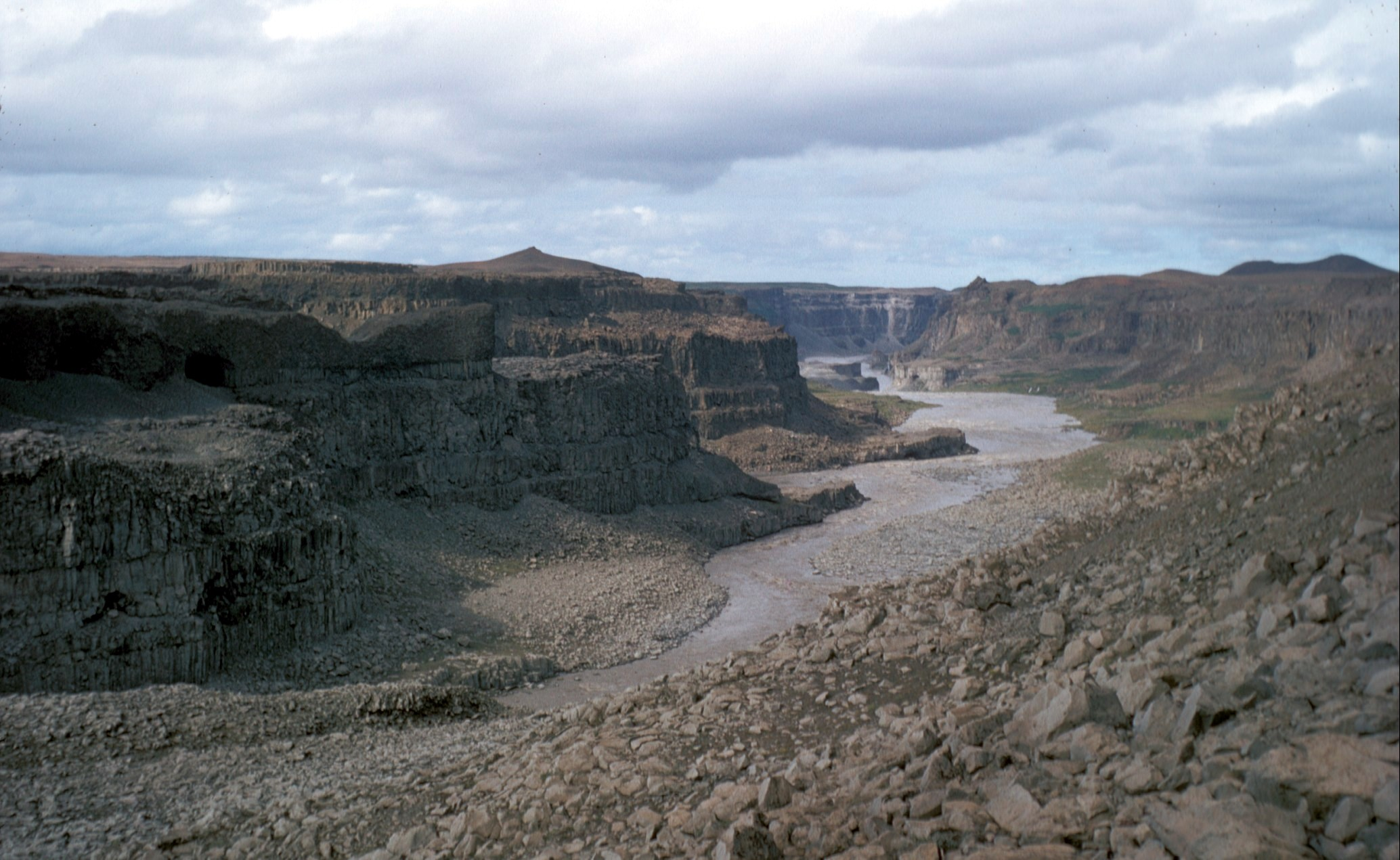
- Jökulsá á Fjöllum downstream from Dettifoss

Location
- Country: Iceland

Physical characteristics
- Source: Vatnajökull
  - location: Central Iceland
- Length: 206 km (128 mi) approx.
- Basin size: 7,380 km^{2} (2,850 sq mi) approx.
- Discharge
  - average: 183 m^{3}/s (6,500 cu ft/s) approx.

Jökulsá á Fjöllum (Icelandic pronunciation: [ˈjœːkʏlsˌauː auː ˈfjœtlʏm]; "glacial river in the mountains") is the second longest river in Iceland (206 km). Its source is the Vatnajökull glacier. It flows into the Greenland Sea. Jökulsá á Fjöllum streams over the waterfalls Selfoss, Dettifoss, Hafragilsfoss, and Réttarfoss, the second of which is the most powerful waterfall in Europe.

The source of the river is in the Vatnajökull National Park, one of three national parks in Iceland. The river is located in the northeast of Iceland and forms the eastern boundary of Ódáðahraun, an extensive lava field. Its drainage basin is the largest in Iceland at 7,380 square kilometers.

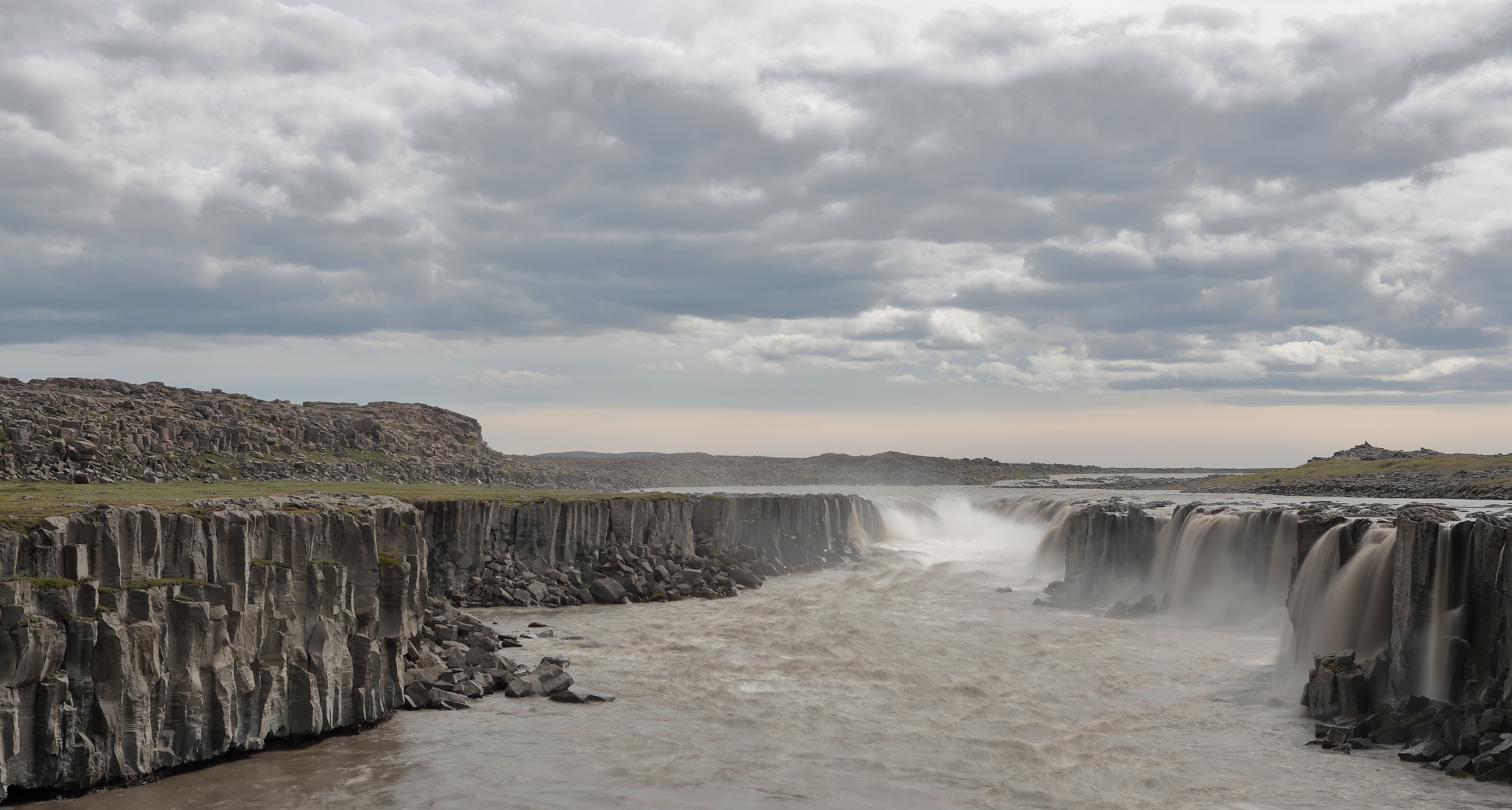
Selfoss, one of the main waterfalls in Jökulsá á Fjöllum river

== Glacial flooding ==
Dettifoss drops into the Jökulsárgljúfur canyon, a feature which, along with the Ásbyrgi gorge, appears to have been formed by catastrophic glacial flooding caused by volcanic activity. The volcano in question was possibly Bárðarbunga, which has been identified as posing the risk of a similar event in the future.

The largest jökulhlaups (glacial floods) in Iceland are known to have occurred along Jökulsá á Fjöllum between 7100 and 2000 yr BP. The source of these floods were likely eruptions of a major volcano under the Vatnajökull glacier, in the late Holocene. The peak discharge of this flood is estimated to have been 900,000 cubic metres per second (32,000,000 cu ft/s). This can be compared to the flow of the Amazon River, which has an average discharge of 209,000 cubic metres per second (7,400,000 cu ft/s).

The latest research concludes that the Jökulsárgljúfur canyon was formed by three flooding events. These key events occurred two, five and nine thousand years ago, separated by millennia of relative stability.

== See also ==
- List of rivers of Iceland
