= Jökulsárgljúfur National Park =

National park in Iceland

Coordinates: 65°55′08″N 16°31′14″W

Jökulsárgljúfur National Park (Icelandic pronunciation: [ˈjœːkʏlsˌaurˌkljuː(v)ʏr̥]) is a former national park situated in the north of Iceland around the river Jökulsá á Fjöllum. It lies to the north of the Dettifoss waterfall. On 7 June 2008, it became a part of the larger Vatnajökull National Park.

== Geography ==
The area is of interest because of its chaotic canyon and volcanic mountains. Eight thousand years ago, volcanic fissures of the Askja volcanic system erupted directly underneath the river and glacial ice. This caused explosions and chaotic flooding.

The center of the park was Vesturdalur with Hljóðaklettar (rock of echoes). Rauðhólar (red mountain) is of interest because of its special colouring due to iron oxidations. Another sight is the canyon of Ásbyrgi to the north of the park which is formed like a horseshoe.

== Gallery ==
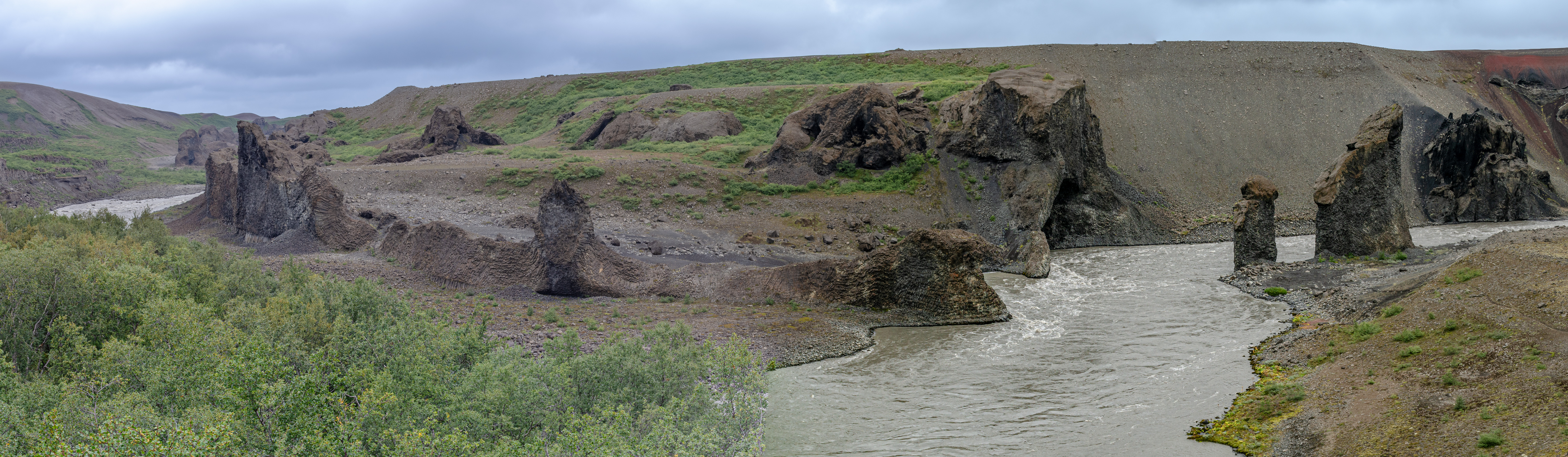
Rock formations in Vesturdalur

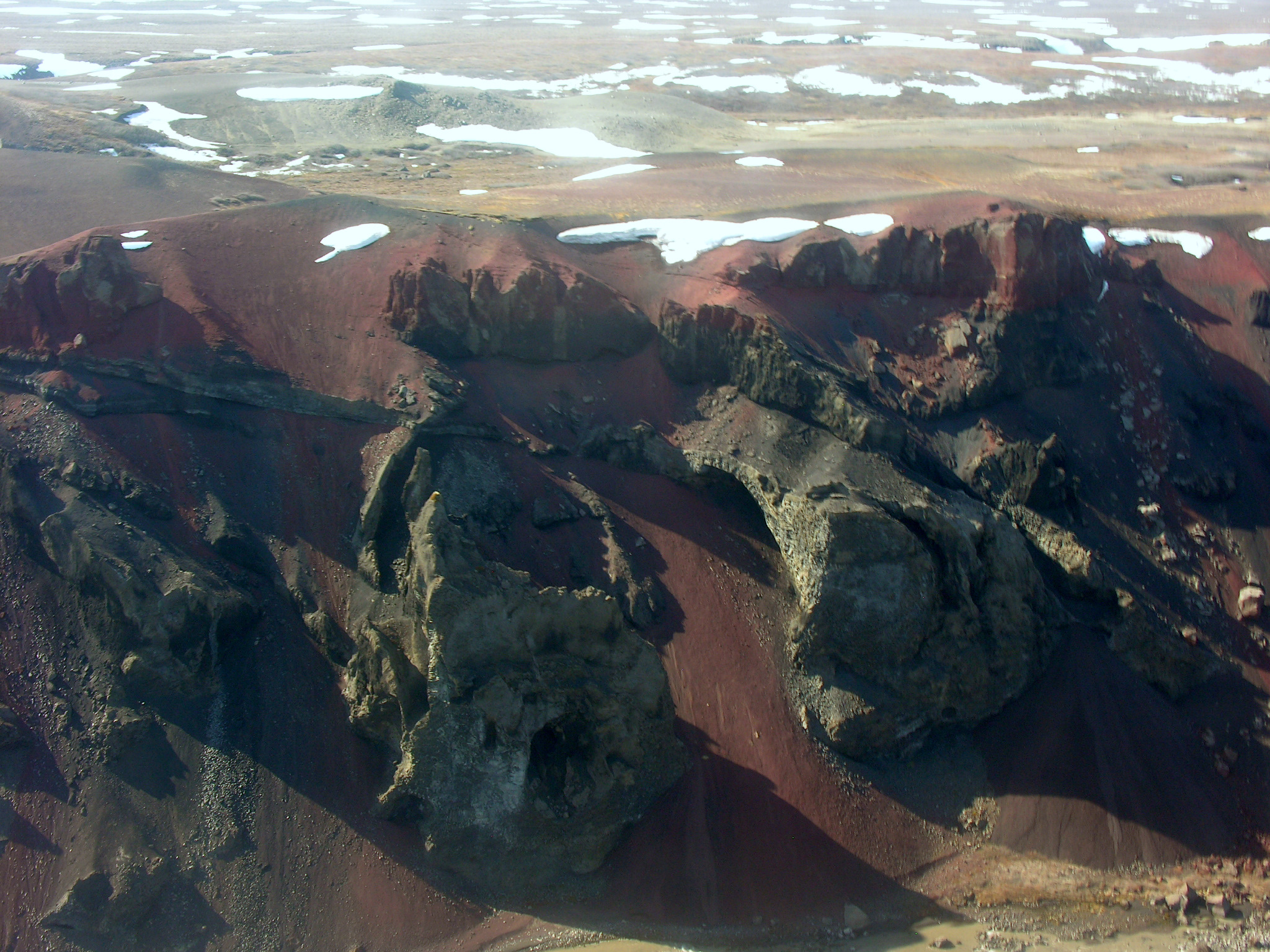
Rauðhólar (Vesturdalur)
