= Ásbyrgi =

Glacial canyon in Iceland

Coordinates: 66°00′52″N 16°30′12″W

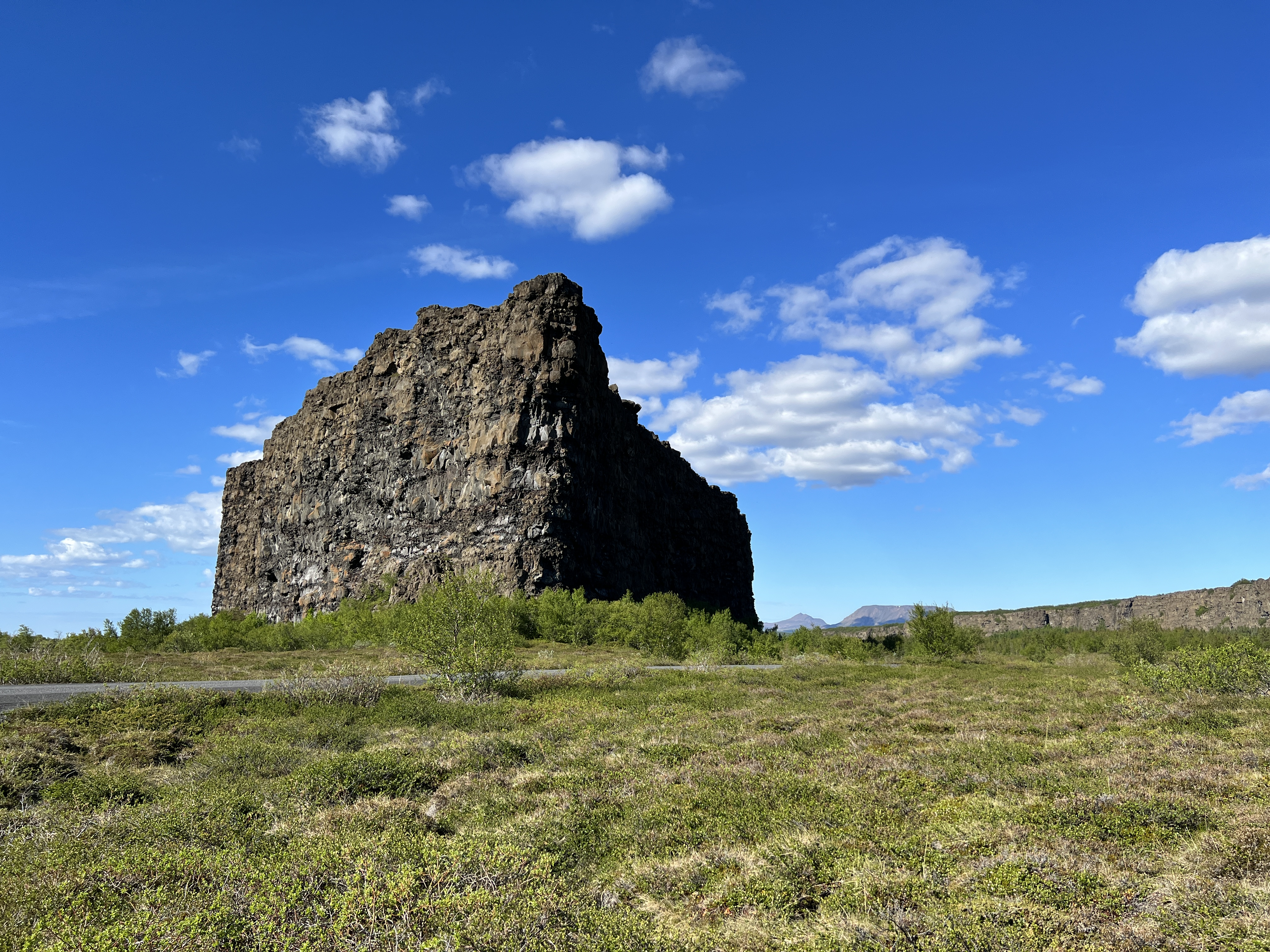
Eyjan is a prominent cliff inside Asbyrgi canyon, best viewed from the south. A hiking trail on top of it delivers a panorama view over the Asbyrgi canyon itself.

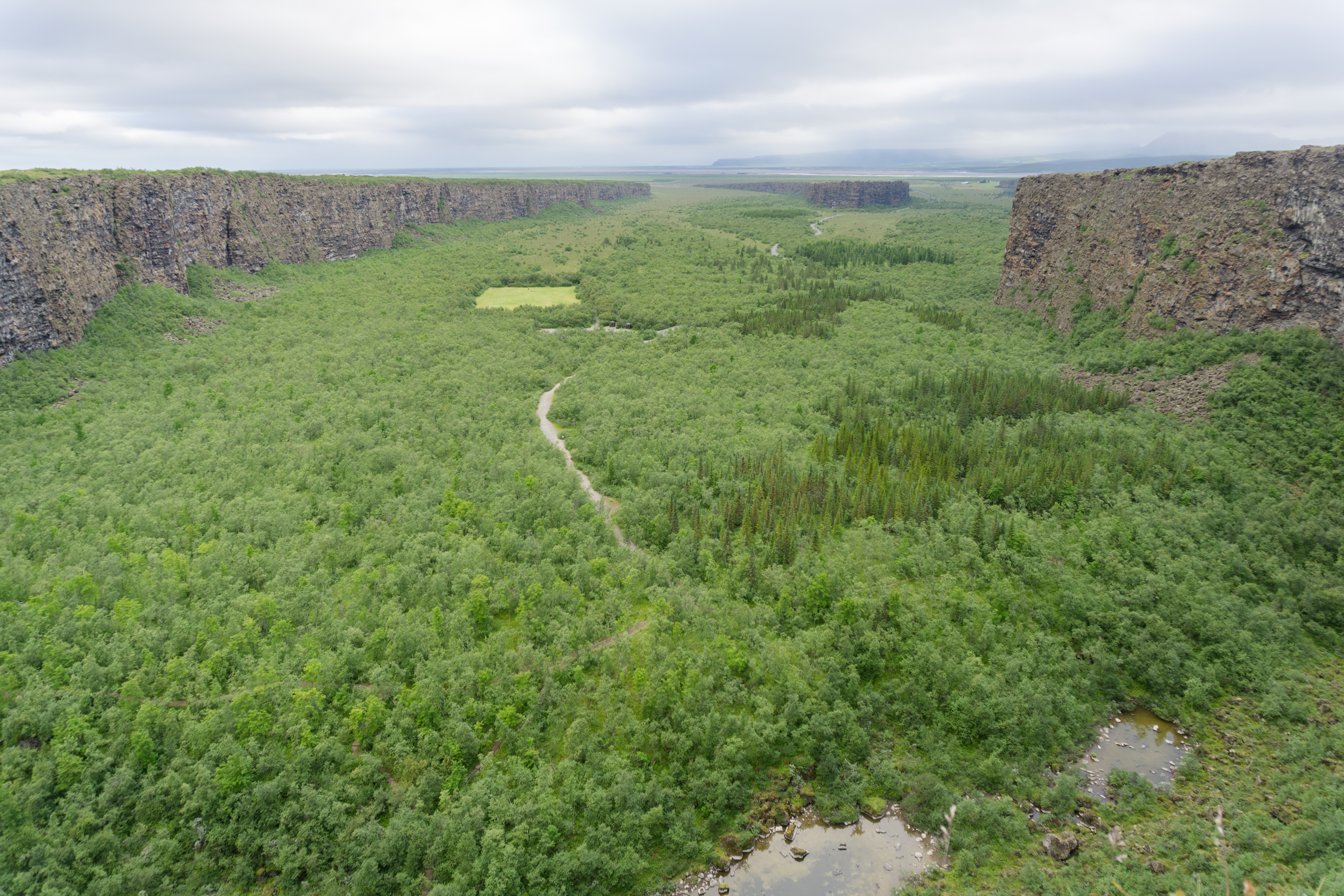
View from the top of Ásbyrgi canyon

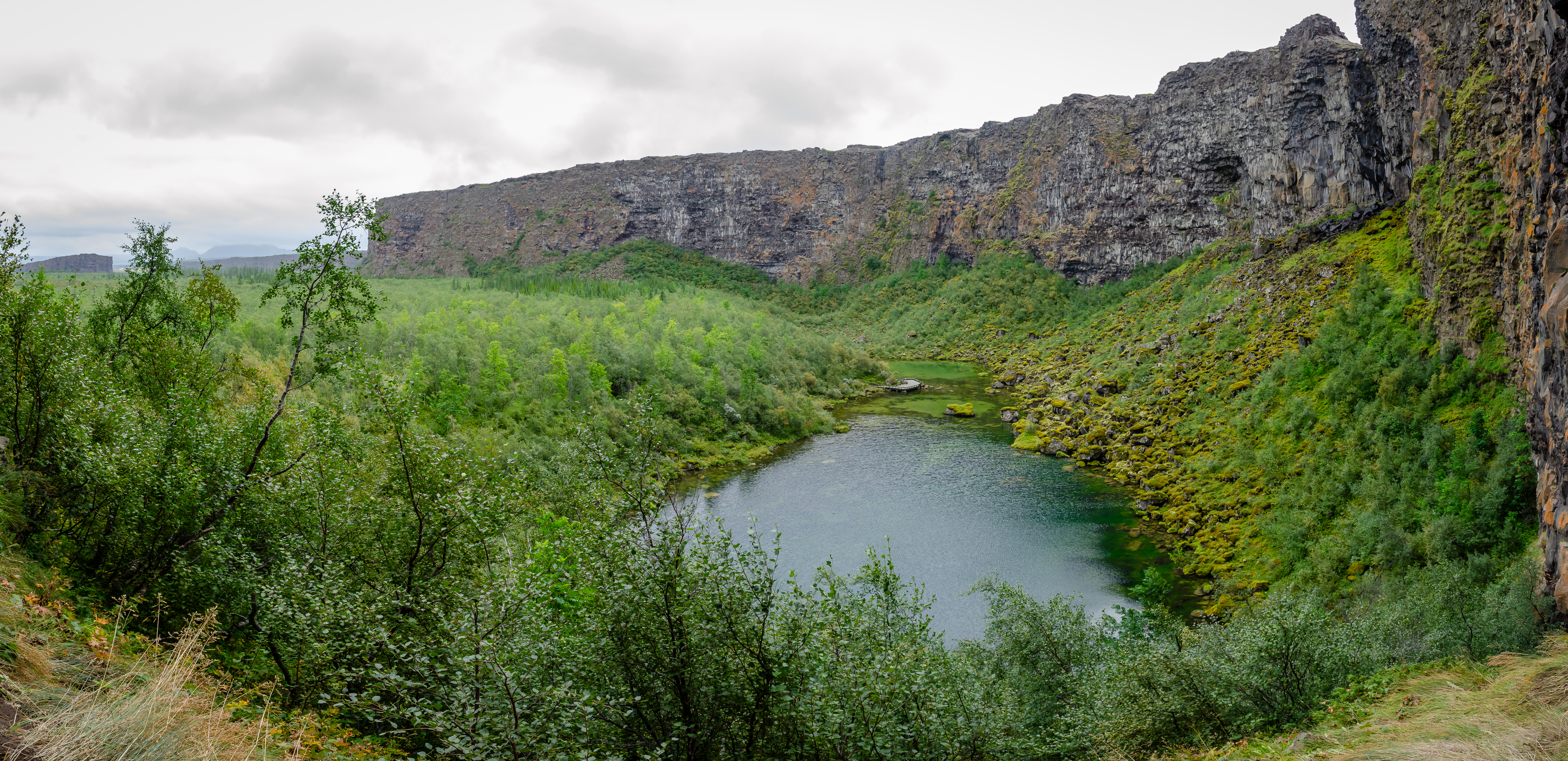
Botnstjörn lake

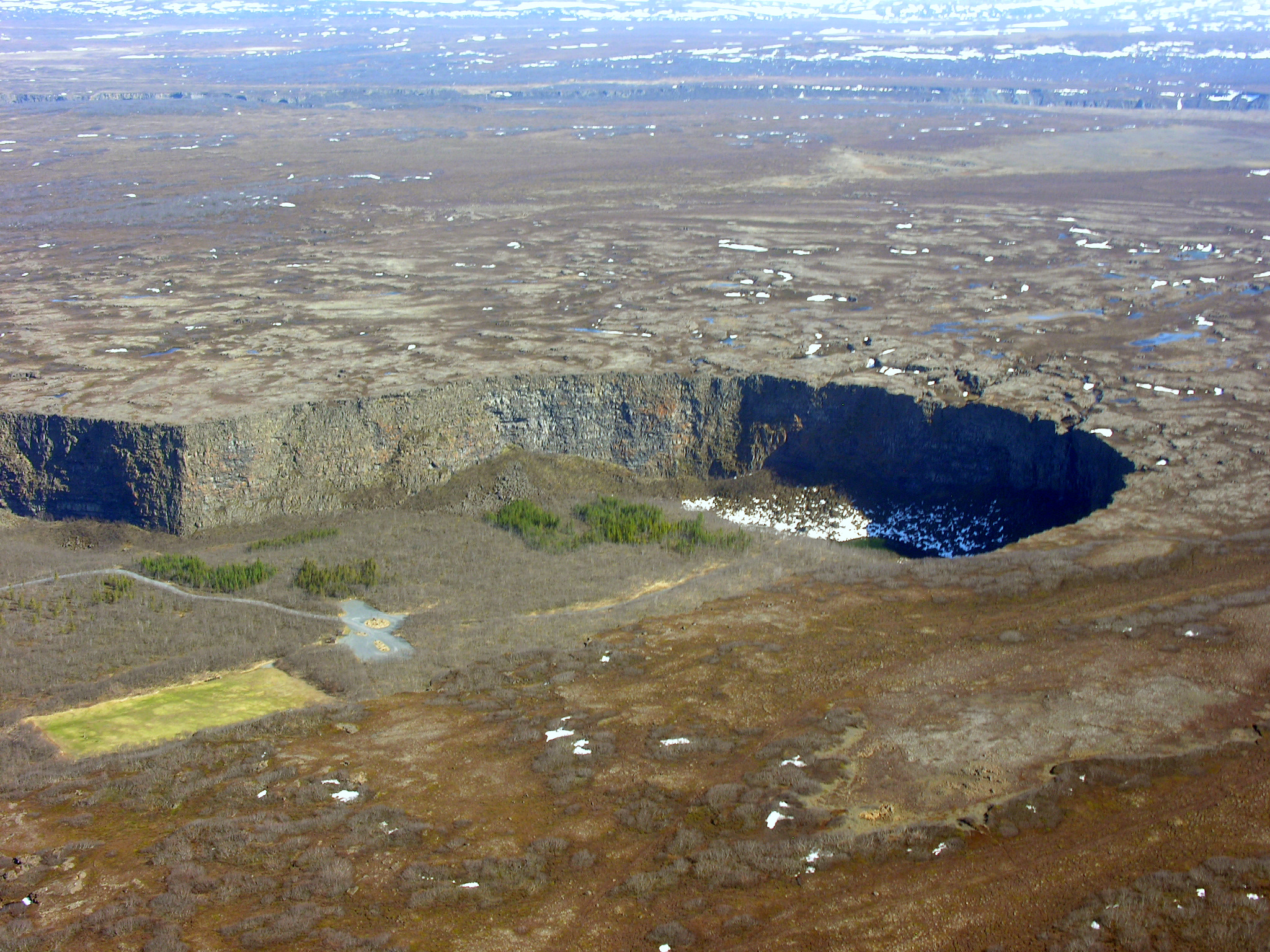
Aerial view of Ásbyrgi

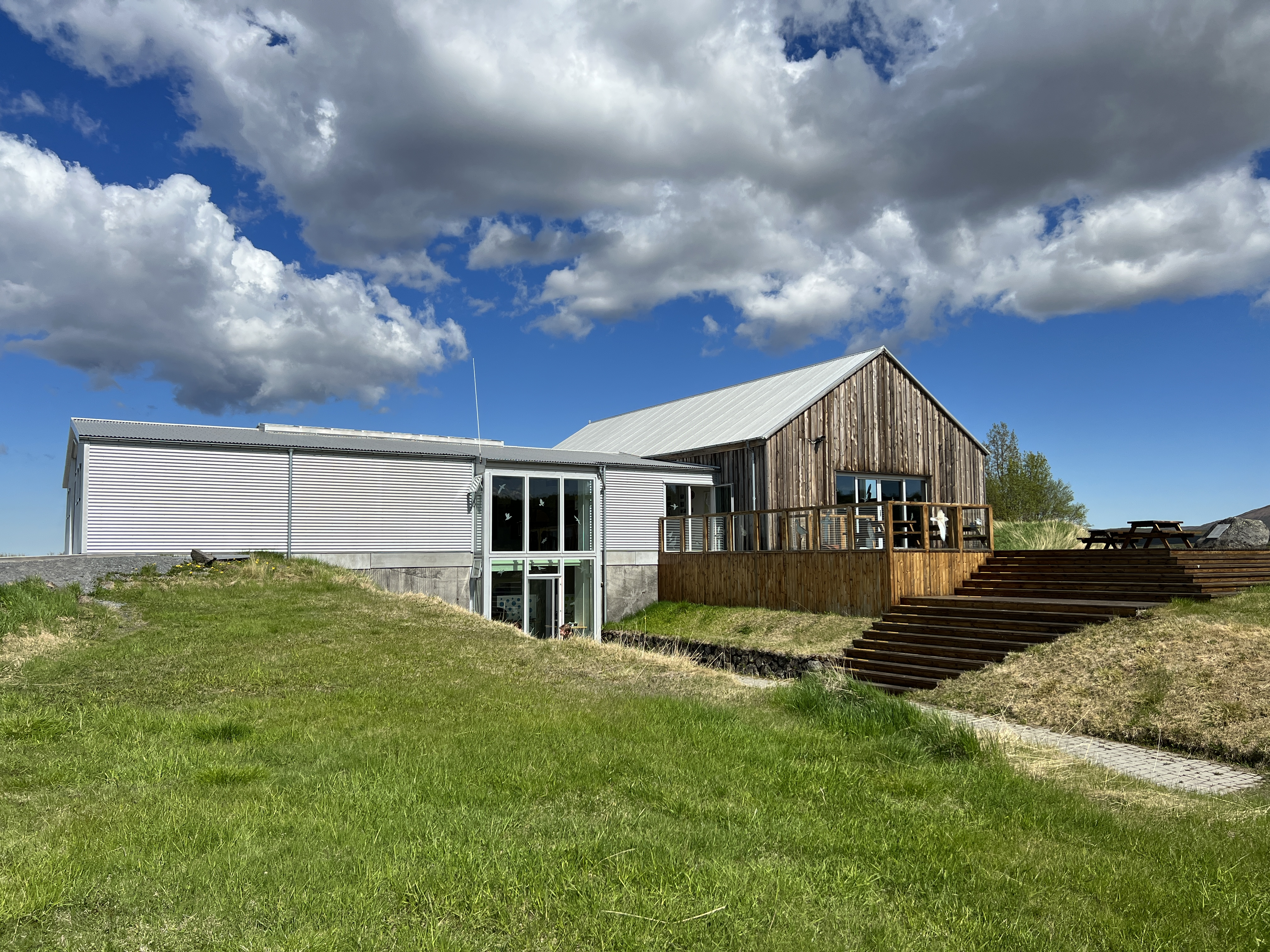
Asbyrgi Visitor Centre is located at the mouth of Asbyrgi canyon.

Ásbyrgi (Icelandic pronunciation: [ˈausˌpɪrcɪ]) is a glacial canyon and forest in the north of Iceland, located approximately 38 kilometres (24 mi) east of Húsavík on the Diamond Circle road. The horseshoe-shaped depression is part of the Vatnajökull National Park and measures approximately 3.5 km in length and over 1 km wide. For more than half of its length, the canyon is divided through the middle by a distinctive rock formation 25 meters high called Eyjan ([ˈeiːjan], "the Island"), from which a vast landscape is seen.

The canyon's steep sides are formed by cliffs up to 100 metres (330 ft) in height. Within the canyon is a woodland of birch and willow. Between 1947 and 1977, a number of foreign tree species were introduced, including spruce, larch and pine. The small lake Botnstjörn [ˈpɔsːˌtʰjœ(r)tn̥] is home to a variety of waterfowl species.

Ásbyrgi was most likely formed by catastrophic glacial flooding of the river Jökulsá á Fjöllum after the last ice age, first 8–10,000 years ago, and then again some 3,000 years ago. The river has since changed its course and now runs about 2 km to the east.

The legend explains the unusual shape of the canyon differently. Nicknamed Sleipnir's footprint, it is said that the canyon was formed when Odin's eight-legged horse, Sleipnir, touched one of its feet to the ground here.
