= Dettifoss =

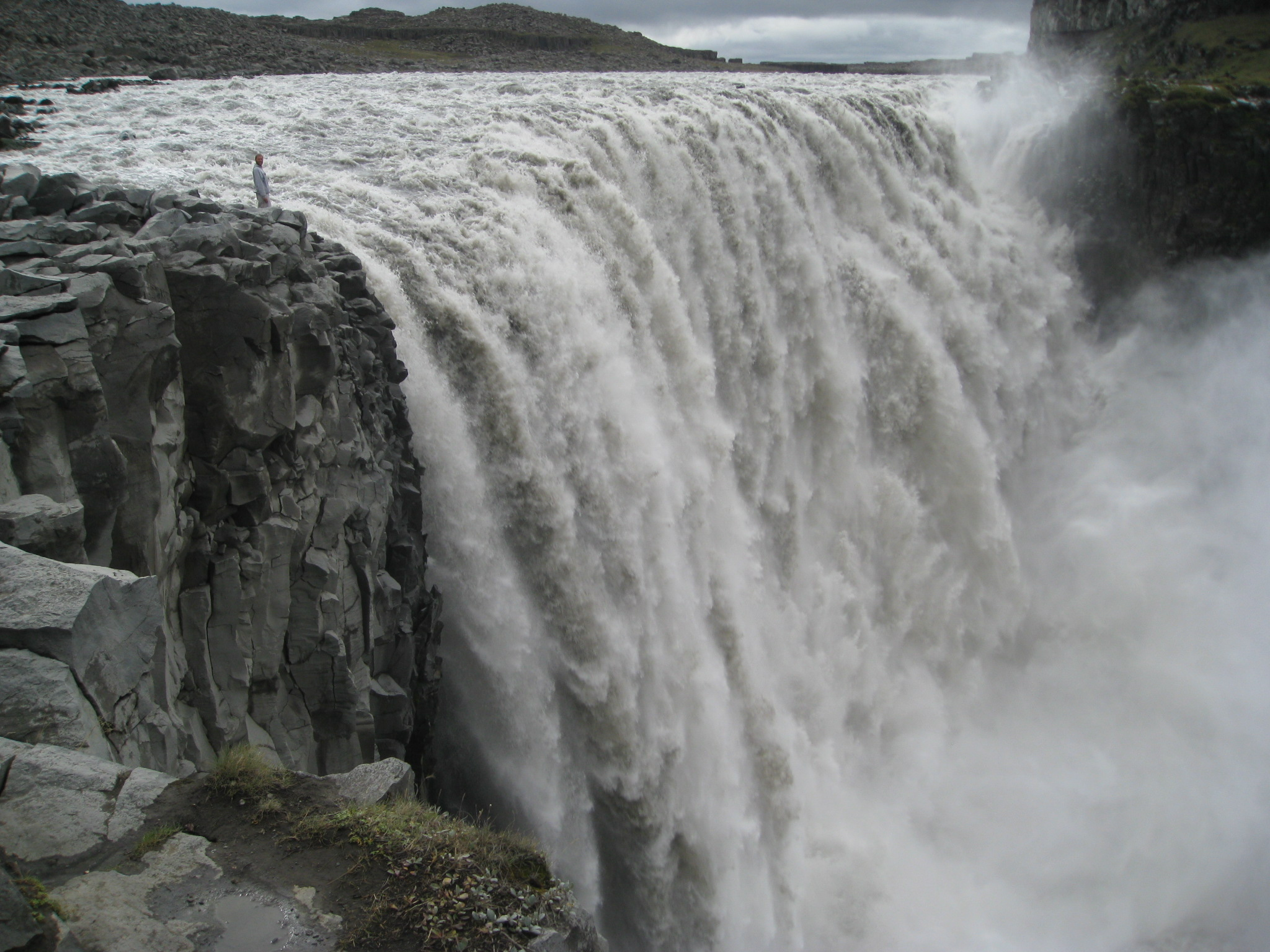
- Dettifoss, seen from the east (a person next to the fall provides scale)

- Location within Iceland
- Location: Northeast Iceland
- Coordinates: 65°48′52.8″N 16°23′04.1″W
- Type: Cataract
- Total height: 44 m (144 ft)
- Number of drops: 1
- Watercourse: Jökulsá á Fjöllum
- Average flow rate: 193 m³/s (6,816 cu ft/s)

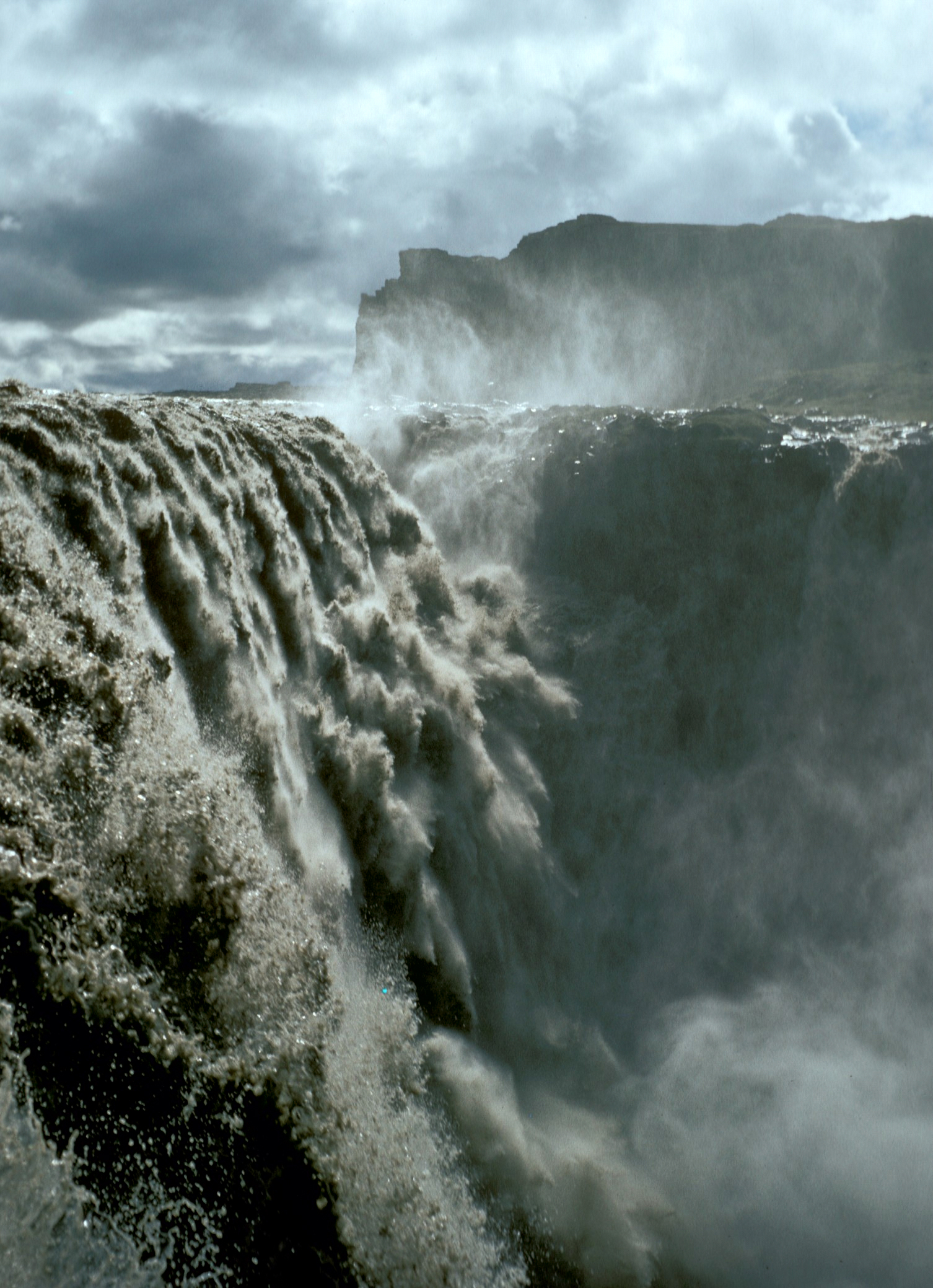
Detailed view of Dettifoss

Dettifoss (Icelandic pronunciation: [ˈtɛhtɪˌfɔsː]) is a waterfall in Vatnajökull National Park in Northeast Iceland, and is reputed to be the second most powerful waterfall in Europe after the Rhine Falls. Dettifoss is situated on the Jökulsá á Fjöllum river, which flows from the Vatnajökull glacier and collects water from a large area in Northeast Iceland. The sediment-rich runoff colours the water a greyish white.

The falls are 100 metres (330 ft) wide and have a drop of 44 metres (144 ft) down to the canyon Jökulsárgljúfur. It is the second largest waterfall in Iceland in terms of volume discharge (behind the Urriðafoss), having an average water flow of 193 m³/s. The superlative of "most powerful" comes from its water flow multiplied by its fall distance.

In Icelandic, the name derives from detta ("fall" or "collapse") and foss ("waterfall").

== Tourist access ==
Dettifoss is served on its west side by Route 862, a tarmac road built in 2011. Road 862 gives access to Dettifoss in all seasons more and less, while an older gravel road (Route 864) serves the east side and is usually passable in summer only.

On the west bank there are minimal facilities, including a pit toilet, maintained hiking path and a view-platform. On the east bank there is an information panel maintained by the staff of Vatnajökull National Park (Vatnajökulsþjóðgarður), a public toilet, and a trail to the waterfall.

Dettifoss is located on the Diamond Circle, a popular tourist route around Húsavík and Lake Mývatn in North Iceland.

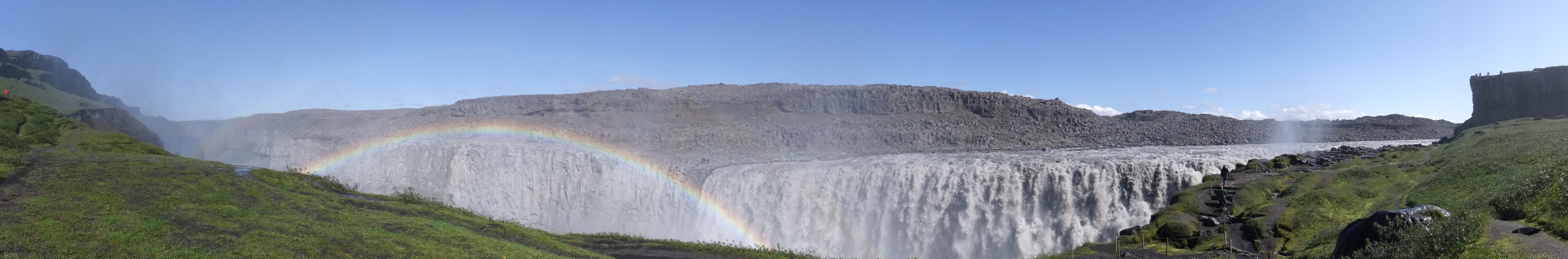
Panorama view taken from the west bank of Dettifoss

== In media ==
The musical composition "Dettifoss" (Op. 57) by Jón Leifs is inspired by this waterfall.

The waterfall is featured in the opening scene of the science-fiction film Prometheus (2012), standing in as a landscape on a primordial Earth.

== See also ==
- List of waterfalls
- Waterfalls of Iceland
