= Yakubov =

Yakubov or Jakubov (Russian: Якубов) is a Slavic masculine surname. Its feminine counterpart is Yakubova, Jakubova. It is a patronymic surname derived from the given name Yakub. Notable people with the surname include:

- Alexander Jakubov (born 1991), Czechoslovak football striker
- Apollinariya Yakubova (died 1913 or 1917), Russian revolutionary
- Ikram Yakubov, Uzbek intelligence officer
- Jakub Jakubov (born 1989), Slovak footballer
- Lina Yakubova (1976–2011), Armenian documentary film producer and writer
- Maryam Yakubova (1929–1987), Uzbekistani stage and film actress
- Maryam Yakubova, Uzbekistani educator
- Mikhail Yakubov (born 1982), Russian ice hockey player
- Bakhrom Yakubov (1961-2021) Uzbek film director and screenwriter
- Yoqubov, Uzbek variant; may be written as Yakubov if transliterated via Russian language

== See also ==
- Tom Yaacobov (born 1992), Israeli triple jumper
- Jakubowski
- Jakubów (disambiguation)
- Yagupov
- Yakupov
