= Jakubov =

Jakubov may refer to:

- Jakubov (surname)
- Jakubov, Slovakia, a village in Malacky District, Bratislava Region, Slovakia
- Jakubov u Moravských Budějovic, a village and municipality in Třebíč District, Vysočina Region, Czech Republic
- Lesní Jakubov, a village and municipality in Třebíč District, Vysočina Region, Czech Republic
- Jakubova Voľa, a village and municipality in Sabinov District, Prešov Region, Slovakia

== See also ==
- Jakubów (disambiguation)
