= Jakubowski =

Jakubowski, Yakubovsky, Yakubovskiy, Yakubovskii or Iakubovskii (Polish: Jakubowski, Ukrainian: Якубовський, Russian: Якубовский) is a Slavic masculine surname of Polish origin. Its feminine counterpart is Jakubowska, Yakubovskaya or Iakubovskaia. It is a toponymic surname derived from any of the places named Jakubowo, Jakubów, Jakubowice and literally meaning "of Jakubowo", etc. The places themselves mean "belonging to Jakub".

Notable people with this surname include:

- Alexander Yakubovsky (born 1985), Russian politician
- Angelika Jakubowska, Polish model
- Anna Jakubowska (1927–2022), Polish World War II combatant
- Bernd Jakubowski (1952–2007), German association football player
- Dmitry Yakubovskiy (born 1963), Russian businessman
- Franz Jakubowski (1912–1970), Polish–German philosopher
- Fuad Yakubovsky (1908–1975), Soviet Communist party functionary and statesman
- Gerald Jakubowski, American engineer, president of the Rose–Hulman Institute of Technology
- Igor Jakubowski (born 1992), Polish boxer
- Ivan Yakubovsky, (1912–1976), Soviet military leader
- Maxim Jakubowski (born 1944), British writer
- Thad J. Jakubowski (1924–2013), American Roman Catholic bishop
- Krystyna Jakubowska (born 1942), Polish volleyball player
- Wanda Jakubowska (1907–1998), Polish film director
