= Uzbekistan Airways Flight 1154 =

2004 aviation accident

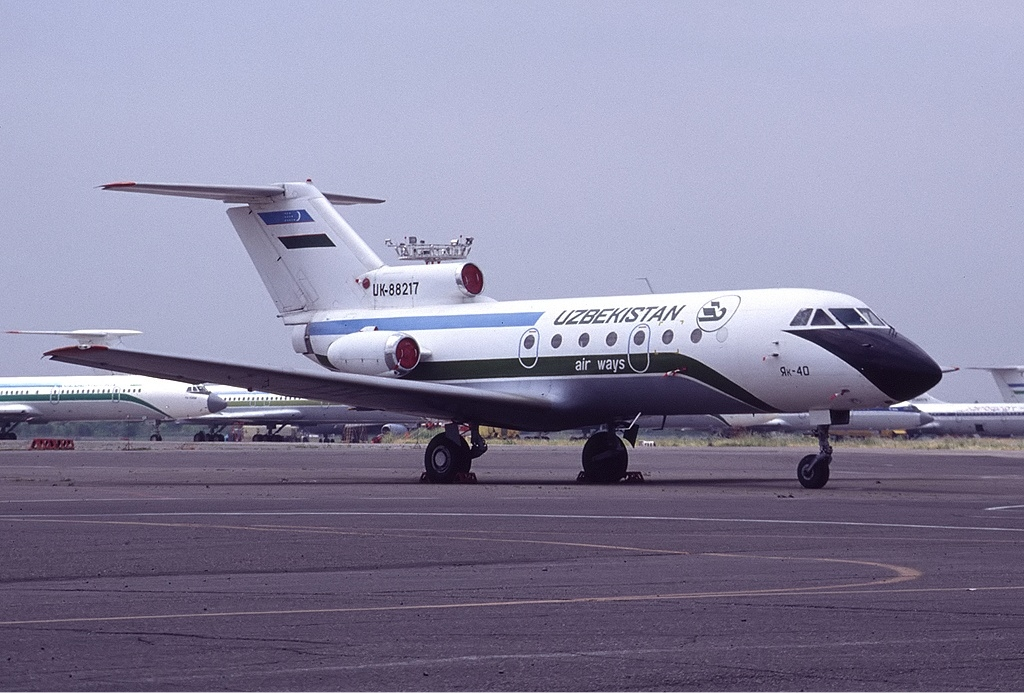
- An Uzbekistan Airways Yak-40 similar to the accident aircraft

Accident
- Date: 13 January 2004
- Summary: Crashed on landing due to pilot error
- Site: Tashkent International Airport, Tashkent, Uzbekistan; 41°15′41″N 69°18′35″E

Aircraft
- Aircraft type: Yakovlev Yak-40
- Operator: Uzbekistan Airways
- Registration: UK-87985
- Flight origin: Termez Airport, Termez, Uzbekistan
- Destination: Tashkent International Airport, Tashkent, Uzbekistan
- Occupants: 37
- Passengers: 32
- Crew: 5
- Fatalities: 37
- Survivors: 0

Uzbekistan Airways Flight 1154 (HY1154/UZB1154) was a scheduled domestic passenger flight which was operated by Uzbekistan flag carrier Uzbekistan Airways from Termez Airport in the city of Termez, near the Afghanistan border, to Uzbekistan's capital of Tashkent. On 13 January 2004 the aircraft operating the flight, a Yakovlev Yak-40 registered in Uzbekistan as UK-87985, collided with a radar station while landing at Tashkent, flipped over, caught fire and exploded, killing all 37 people on board. Weather was reportedly sub par for flying.

== Flight ==
The Yakovlev Yak-40 was registered in Uzbekistan as UK-87985. The flight was a domestic flight from Termez, a city near the country's border with Afghanistan, to its capital airport, the Tashkent International Airport. Termez became a major hub for humanitarian aid into northern Afghanistan after the start of the War on Terror in 2001. German troops had also been using the airport in Termez as a support base for peacekeeping troops in Afghanistan. The flight was nearly fully loaded, carrying 32 passengers and 5 crew. The flight crew consisted of Captain Alexander Alexanov, First Officer Rustam Ilyasov, Flight Instructor Akmal Kamalov and Flight Engineer Noel Kurmaev.

The aircraft was cleared to land by controllers at Tashkent at around 1900 hours local time. The area was in full darkness and the weather had deteriorated significantly, with the airport being shrouded in fog that limited visibility on the ground to 1300 meters. 12.5 km from the airport, Flight 1154 increased its rate of descent, bringing it below the glideslope. The crew then maintained level flight until they become nearer to the airport. As the plane approached the threshold of the runway, it was still 30 to 40 meters above ground level, when it should have been less than half that height and in landing configuration. When the pilots became aware that they were running out of runway, they increased engine power, but it was too late for the aircraft to climb and go around. The right wing of the aircraft struck either a radio beacon or a stanchion of approach lights, which tore off the wing, and then hit a concrete wall, losing the left wing. Flight 1154 then flipped over and exploded. Rescue services reached the crash site, but found no survivors.

== Responses ==
Immediately after the crash, Uzbek police sealed off the crash site. Uzbekistan President Islam Karimov visited the crash site and talked with rescue workers. Prime Minister Shavkat Mirziyayev and his aides had arrived at Tashkent airport and approached relatives of the victims and led them to a room.

Several hours after the crash, Tashkent International Airport was closed due to foggy condition.

== Investigation ==
The government ordered a full investigation into the crash. Early indication suggested that bad weather was the cause of the accident. Officials stated that there were no evidence of foul play in the crash. In his 2006 book, Murder in Samarkand, however, former British Ambassador to Uzbekistan, Craig Murray, wrote that the scene of the crash and the bodies of the victims had been tampered with by Uzbek officials and that "there was never any attempt at a proper investigation". In 2008, a former Uzbek spy, Ikrom Yakubov, alleged that the plane crash had been engineered by the Uzbek leadership, lending credibility to the position long held by activists and critics. Yakubov appeared in August 2009 on BBC's Newsnight. Ambassador Murray was quoted in 2008, regarding the Conroy case, by Radio Free Europe: "These are not fanciful allegations. These are things where the new evidence is adding to the picture of things that we pretty well already knew and had some evidence for."

== See also ==
- TAM Airlines Flight 3054
- S7 Airlines Flight 778
