= Birkir =

Birkir [ˈpɪr̥cɪr̥] is an Icelandic male given name. Notable people with this name include:

- Birkir Bjarnason (born 1988), Icelandic football player
- Birkir Blær (born 2000), Icelandic singer
- Birkir Ívar Guðmundsson, Icelandic handball player
- Birkir Hólm Guðnason (born 1974)
- Birkir Jón Jónsson (born 1979), Icelandic politician
- Birkir Valur Jónsson (born 1998), Icelandic football player
- Birkir Kristinsson (born 1964), Icelandic football player
- Birkir Már Sævarsson (born 1984), Icelandic football player
