= Yoqubov =

Yoqubov or Yokubov is an Uzbek-language variant of the surname Yakubov. Notable people with the surname include:

- Doston Yokubov (born 1995), Uzbek Olympic weightlifter
- Odil Yoqubov (1926–2009), Uzbek writer
- Oʻrinbek Yoqubov (1917–1989), Soviet Uzbek officer, Hero of the Soviet Union

== See also ==
- Ikram Yakubov, Uzbek intelligence officer
