= Gullfaxi (aircraft) =

General information
- Type: Boeing 727
- Manufacturer: Boeing
- Status: On display
- Owners: Flugfélag Íslands; Flugleiðir; UPS
- Registration: TF-FIE

History
- In service: 1967–2007
- Preserved at: Icelandic Aviation Museum

Gullfaxi was a Boeing 727 jet aircraft that was in use by Flugfélag Íslands. It became the first domestically owned commercial jet airplane in Iceland's history when it arrived in 1967. It was in service in Iceland until 1985 when it was sold to UPS. In 2007, it was retired in New Mexico. In 2008, it was acquired by Avion Aircraft Trading which donated the front part of the airplane to the Icelandic Aviation Museum where it is now on display.

It also starred in the 1972 Danish movie The Olsen Gang's Big Score in Copenhagen Airport.
