= Flykhiva =

Airline of Uzbekistan

IATA	ICAO	Call sign
2U	FKH	FLY KHIVA
- Founded: 2021
- Commenced operations: 23 February 2023
- Hubs: Tashkent
- Fleet size: 3
- Parent company: Flykhiva Group
- Headquarters: Tashkent, Uzbekistan
- Key people: Farkhad Mukhutdinov, commercial director
- Website: flykhiva.uz

Flykhiva is a private passenger and cargo airline based in Tashkent, Uzbekistan.

== History ==
In 2022, Flykhiva Group signed a contract with Azerbaijan Airlines, the flag carrier of Azerbaijan.

The carrier received an air operator's certificate (AOC) in 2023 and commenced operations on 23 February 2024. Fly Khiva launched its first passenger service, operating from Tashkent to Urgench in December 2024.

== Destinations ==
Country	City	Airport	Notes	Refs
Belgium	Liège	Liège Airport	Terminated	
China	Hong Kong	Hong Kong International Airport	Terminated	
Georgia	Batumi	Alexander Kartveli Batumi International Airport	Terminated	
Georgia	Tbilisi	Shota Rustaveli Tbilisi International Airport	Terminated	
Latvia	Riga	Riga International Airport	Terminated	
Montenegro	Podgorica	Podgorica Airport	Terminated	
Saudi Arabia	Medina	Prince Mohammad bin Abdulaziz International Airport	Seasonal charter	
Turkey	Istanbul	Istanbul Airport		
Uzbekistan	Andizhan	Andizhan Airport	Terminated	
Uzbekistan	Samarqand	Samarqand International Airport	Seasonal charter	
Uzbekistan	Tashkent	Islam Karimov Tashkent International Airport	Hub	
Uzbekistan	Termez	Termez Airport		
Uzbekistan	Urgench	Urgench Airport	Terminated	

== Fleet ==
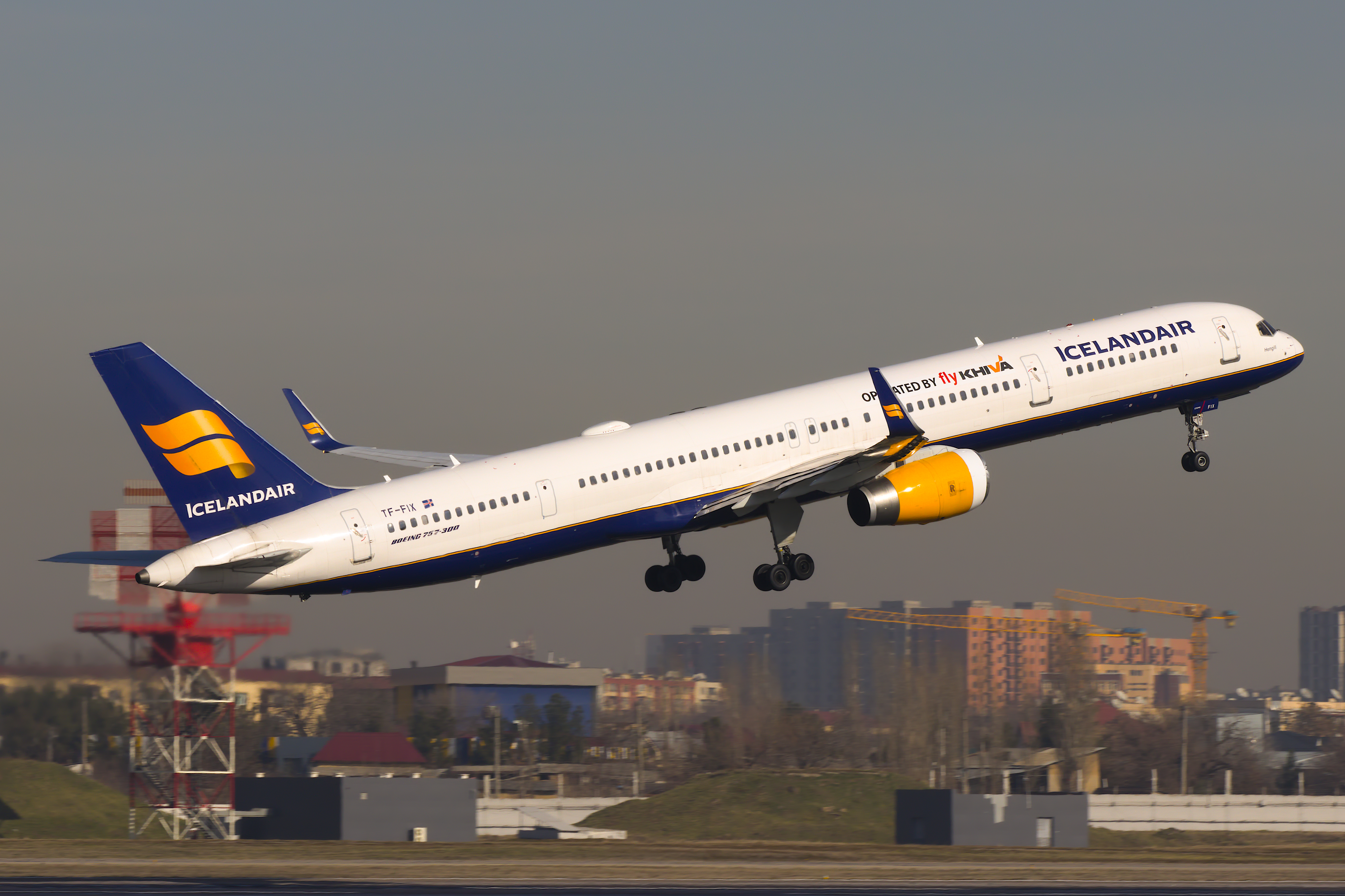
A Flykhiva Boeing 757 operated by Icelandair

As of May 2025, Flykhiva operates an fleet composed of the following aircraft:

Flykhiva fleet
Aircraft	In service	Orders	Seats	Notes
Boeing 767-300BCF				Cargo aircraft
Boeing 757-300			225	
Total	3			
