= Yakupov =

Yakupov (Russian: Якупов) is a Russian/Bashkir/Tatar masculine surname, its feminine counterpart is Yakupova. It may refer to

- Lina Yakupova, Russian footballer
- Ilmir Yakupov (born 1994), Russian footballer
- Nail Yakupov (born 1993), Russian ice hockey player
- Valiulla Yakupov (1963–2012), Muslim cleric in Tatarstan

== See also ==
- Yagupov
- Yakubov
