= The Icelandic Aviation Museum =

Coordinates: 65.6514°N 18.0757°W

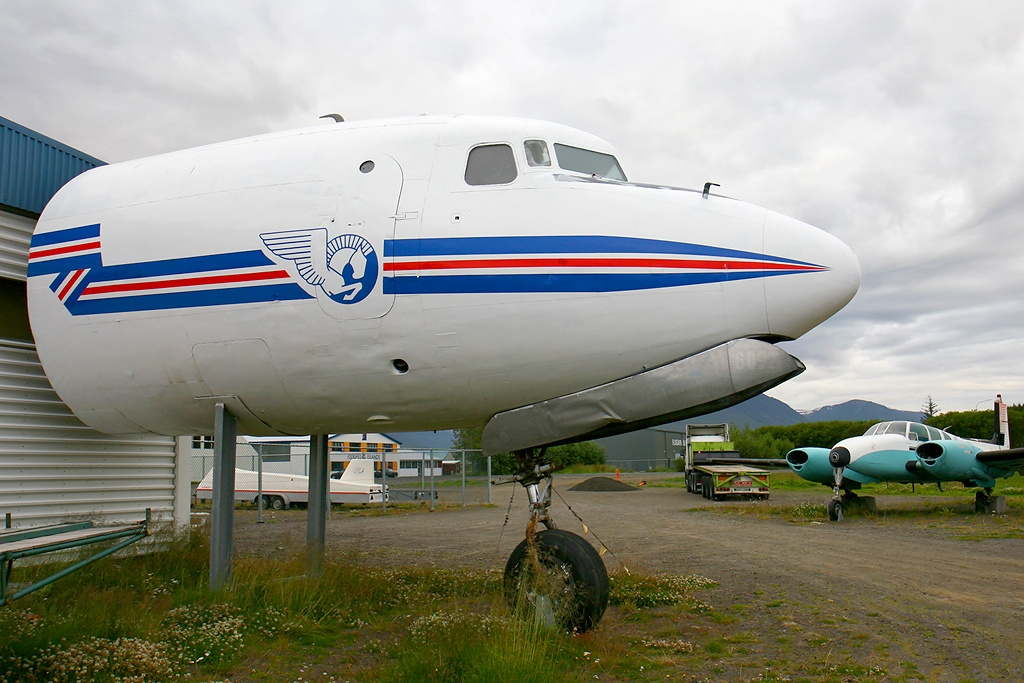
- Douglas DC-6 nose section on display at Aviation Museum of Iceland, 2007
- Established: 1999
- Location: Akureyri Airport, Akureyri
- Type: Aviation museum
- Founders: Air Atlanta; Flugfélag Íslands; Flugleiðir; Íslandsflug; Flugmódelfélag Akureyrar; Íslenska flugsögufélagið; Svifflugfélag Akureyrar; Vélflugfélag Akureyrar
- Website: flugsafn.is

The Icelandic Aviation Museum (Icelandic: Flugsafn Íslands [ˈflʏɣˌsapn ˈistlan(t)s]) covers the history of aviation in Iceland. It is housed at Akureyri Airport and was formally opened on 24 June 2000.

== History ==
The museum was founded on 1 May 1999 and formally opened on 24 June 2000 by Halldór Blöndal, the Speaker of the Althing. It was initially known as the Aviation Museum at Akureyri; another aviation collection existed at Hnjótur in Örlygshöfn. It was renamed in 2005 to reflect its national role. Svanbjörn Sigurðsson, a principal figure in the foundation of the museum, was its first director.

Initially in temporary quarters in a hangar rented by Íslandsbanki, the museum moved in 2007 to a purpose-built building with 2,200 square metres (24,000 sq ft) of space, approximately five times what it previously had; the building was officially opened by Sigrún Björk Jakobsdóttir, the mayor of Akureyri. It celebrated its tenth anniversary in 2009.

The aircraft collection has been used for training by the Icelandic Technical School.

== Collection ==
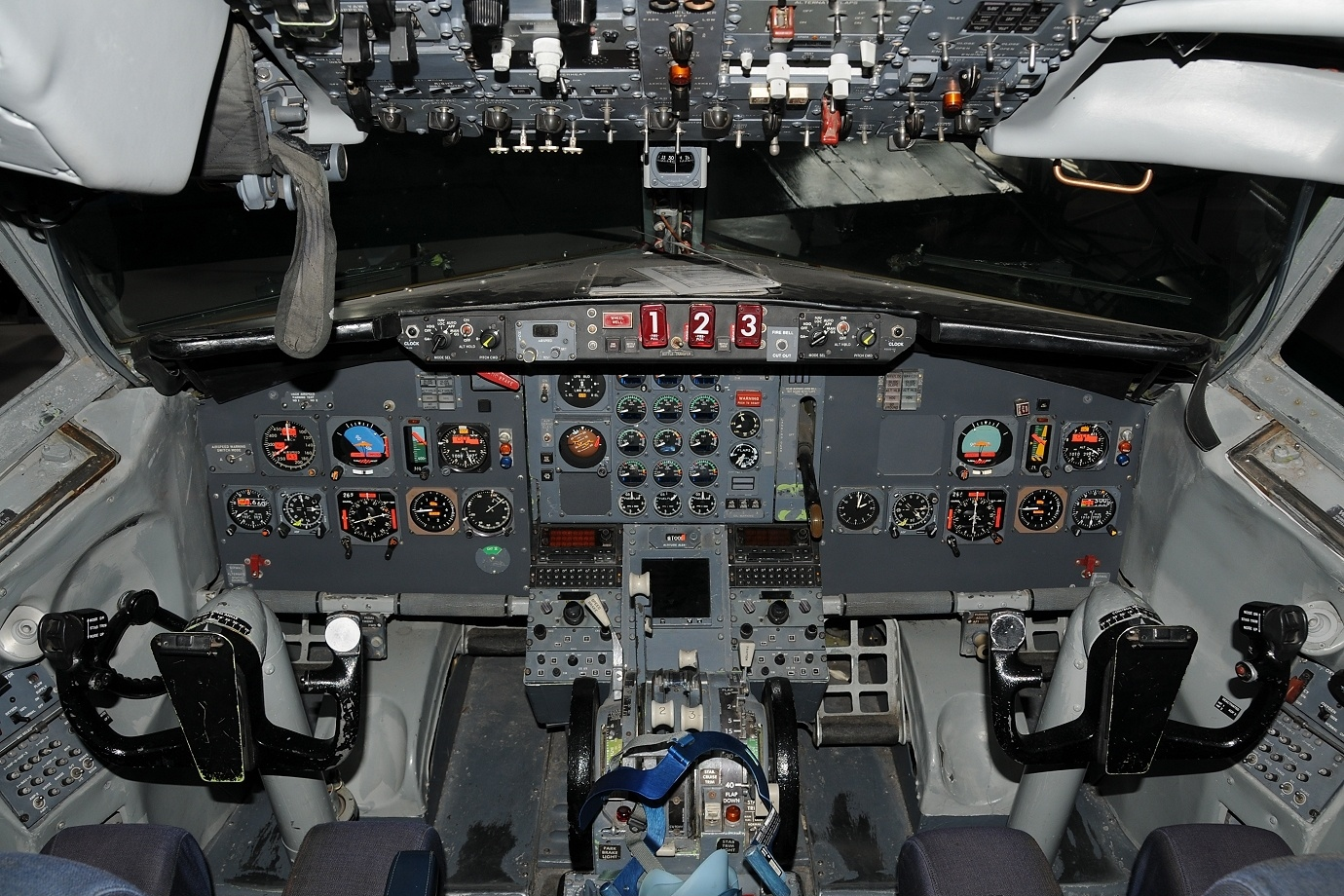
Cockpit of Boeing 727 Gullfaxi

The museum has many photographs of Icelandic aviation through the years and also a number of historic aircraft, many of which it maintains in airworthy condition and flies at least once a year on an annual fly day. These include:

- Klemm L.25e TF-SUX, built in 1934 and brought to Iceland by Germans in 1938; the first plane to land in the Vestmannaeyjar
- Waco YKS-7 identical to TF-ÖRN, the first aircraft operated by Flugfélag Akureyrar, later Flugfélag Íslands, when it began service in 1938
- a twin-engine Beechcraft identical to that first brought to Iceland in 1942
- Björn Pálsson's Auster V, with which he flew the first air ambulance service in Iceland
- a 1943 Douglas DC-3 that saw duty at Keflavík Air Base before transfer to civilian use by Flugfélag Íslands in 1946
- the cockpit of Gullfaxi, Boeing 727 TF-FIE, the country's first jet aircraft, recovered from the Mojave Desert
- TF-SIF, a Aérospatiale SA-365N-1 Dauphin 2 former Icelandic Coast Guard rescue helicopter that was in service for 22 years and is credited to have been involved in the rescue of around 250 lives
- Coast Guard Fokker F-27 TF-SYN
- Árnason JFP-2S-8, an experimental canard aircraft, making use of Blown flap propulsion.

== See also ==
- List of aviation museums
