= Hekla Aurora =

Former Boeing 757 of Icelandair

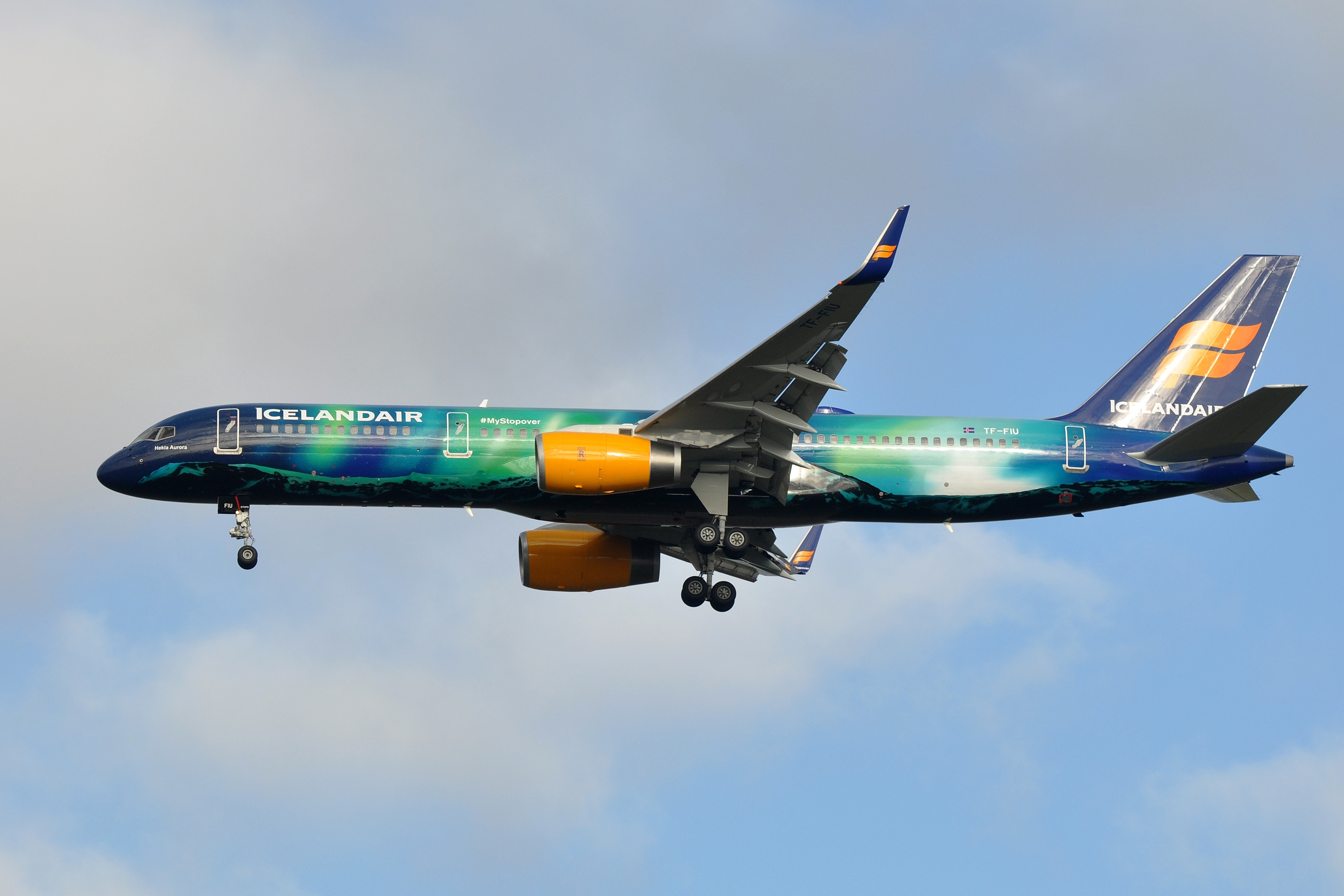
- Hekla Aurora in 2014

General information
- Other name: Norðurljósavélin
- Type: Boeing 757-200
- Manufacturer: Boeing
- Status: Scrapped (6 September 2026)
- Owners: Icelandair (2004–2025); Iberia (1994-2004)
- Construction number: 603
- Registration: TF-FIU

History
- Manufactured: July 1994
- In service: July 1994 – October 2025

Hekla Aurora was a Boeing 757-200 airliner that was in use by Icelandair for 21 years. It became notable for its Aurora Borealis themed livery.

== History ==
The plane was rolled out from Boeing Renton Factory in July 1994. It was originally in service with Spanish flag carrier Iberia but was bought by Icelandair in 2004.

In 2014, it received its Aurora Borealis themed livery. It was one of three Icelandair 757 airliners to receive a custom livery, along with Vatnajökull, which had a glacier theme, and Þingvellir which was painted in the Icelandic flag colours to celebrate the country's 100 years of sovereignty.

In October 2023, the plane was used to airlift Icelandic citizens from Israel following the October 7 attacks. Later in the same month, it was used for the first time in domestic flights between Reykjavík and Akureyri.

The plane was retired in October 2025 and its last flight for Icelandair was a sightseeing flight around Iceland with 140 passengers. The airframe was broken up in early September 2026 at Lleida–Alguaire Airport with many pieces of the fuselage skin sold as keyrings.
