= Yagupov =

Yagupov or Iagupov (Russian: Ягупов), feminine:Yagupova or Iagupova is a Russian-language surname. Notable people with the surname include:

- Alina Iagupova, Ukrainian basketball player
- Irina Kalentieva nee Yagupova, Russian professional cross-country mountain bike racer
- Roman Iagupov, Moldovan and Romanian musician
- Svetlana Yagupova, Ukrainian science fiction writer
- Yevgeniy Yagupov, Soviet mortar designer

== See also ==
- Yakupov
- Yakubov
