= Icelandair =

National airline of Iceland

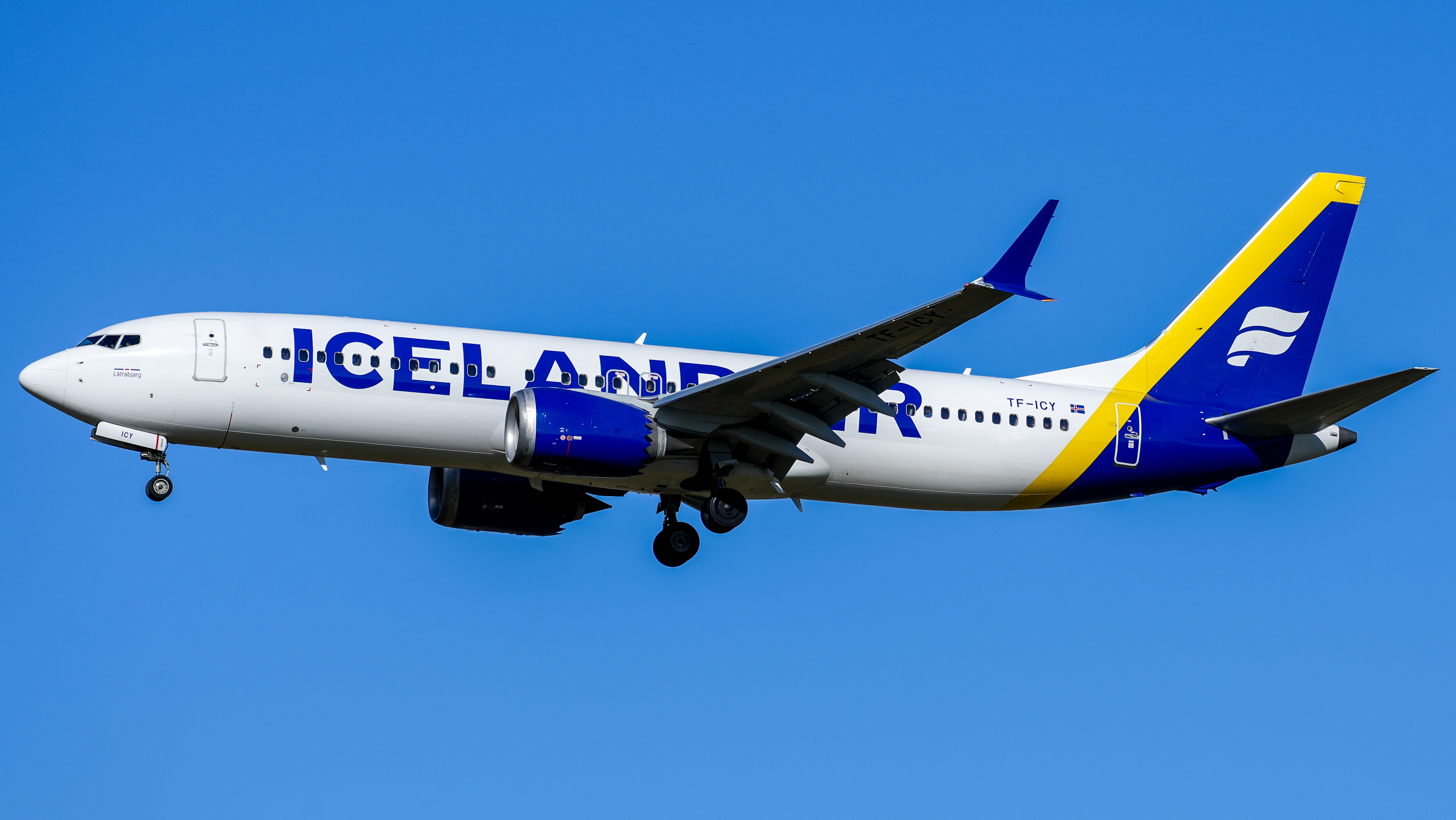
- Icelandair Boeing 737 MAX 8
IATA	ICAO	Call sign
FI	ICE	ICEAIR
- Founded: 3 June 1937; 89 years ago
- AOC #: IS-001
- Hubs: Keflavík International Airport Reykjavik Airport
- Focus cities: Reykjavík
- Frequent-flyer program: Saga Club
- Fleet size: 47
- Destinations: 60
- Parent company: Icelandair Group
- Headquarters: Hafnarfjörður, Iceland
- Key people: Bogi Nils Bogason (CEO)
- Revenue: ▲$1.524 billion (2023)
- Net income: ▲$11 million (2023)
- Employees: 3,638 (2023)
- Website: www.icelandair.com

Icelandair is the flag carrier of Iceland. It is part of the Icelandair Group and operates to destinations on both sides of the Atlantic Ocean from its main hub at Keflavík International Airport. Its smaller domestic-only hub is located at Reykjavík Airport.

The geographical position of Iceland is convenient for one-stop transatlantic flights via the Atlantic Bridge route, which is one pillar of the airline's business strategy, along with traffic to, from, and within the country. Their headquarters are located in Hafnarfjörður.

== History ==
=== Flugfélag Íslands in the early decades ===
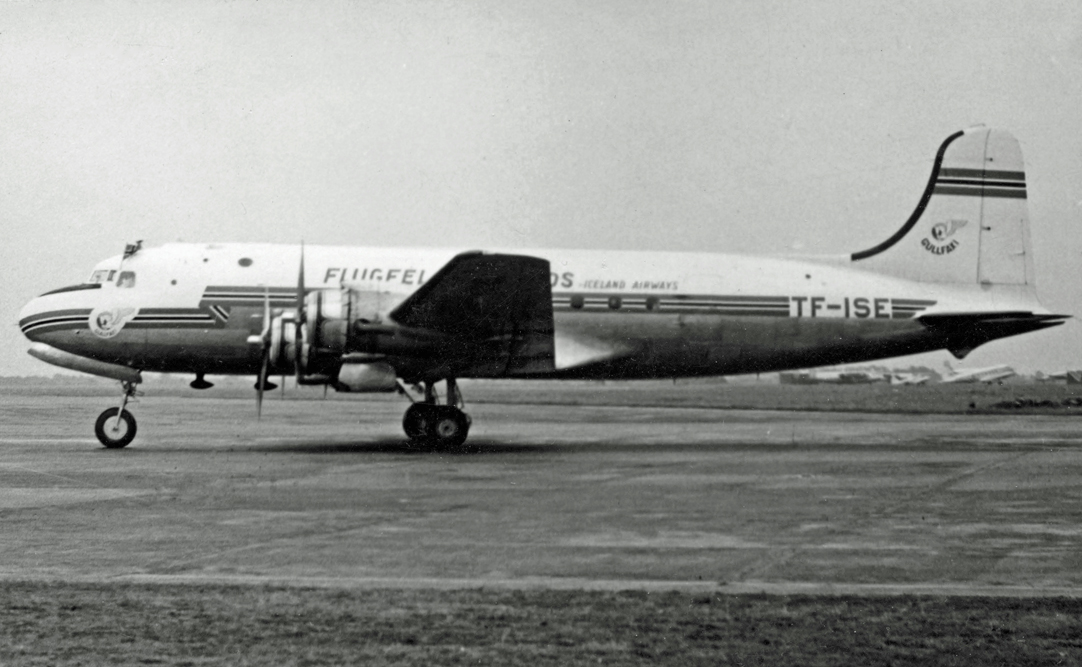
The first Flugfélag Íslands Douglas DC-4, dubbed Gullfaxi, arriving at London Heathrow Airport in June 1953

Icelandair traces its roots back to 1937, when Flugfélag Akureyrar was founded in Akureyri on the north coast of Iceland. Flight operations started in 1938 with a single Waco YKS-7 configured as a floatplane. In 1939 the airline was grounded when this aircraft was destroyed in a capsizing accident. In March 1940, Flugfélag Akureyrar moved its hub to Reykjavík and moved its operations to fixed-wing seaplane scheduled flights from the Vatnsmýri area, and changed its name to Flugfélag Íslands, where it acquired another Waco aircraft and was relaunched in 1940 as Flugfélag Íslands, which translates as Flight Company of Iceland. Seaplane flights were operated in the vicinity of Vatnsmýri in Skerjafjörður and Vatnagarðar. Previously, two unrelated airlines of the same name (Flugfélag Íslands) had existed in the country (from 1919 to 1920, and between 1928 and 1931). For international purposes, the name Iceland Airways was adopted.

In 1940, Iceland was invaded by the British and Reykjavík Airport was established south of the capital during the war. In 1946, the airport was handed over to Icelandic civilian authorities, now called Isavia. Iceland Airways (Icelandair) inherited a small building constructed by the British Army on the west side of the airport. Since 1947, the building has been gradually expanded but is still in use by Icelandair as a domestic terminal in 2024. By the 1950s, Iceland Airways operated flights to Britain and Northern Europe from the airport, as well as domestic flights.

The airline was based from Reykjavík Airport, close to the city centre, and the fleet was expanded with a Beechcraft Model 18 in 1942; and with two De Havilland Dragon Rapides and a Consolidated PBY Catalina in 1944, the latter being the first ever aircraft registered in Iceland to be flown to Iceland by an Icelandic crew from North America. On 11 July 1945, this aircraft operated the first commercial flight over the Atlantic Ocean for the airline, which led from Reykjavík to Largs in Scotland, with four passengers and four crew members on board. Regular flights to Prestwick Airport in Scotland and Copenhagen in Denmark, using Consolidated B-24 Liberator aircraft leased from Scottish Airlines were launched in 1946.

In the same year, the comfort and performance of domestic flights in Iceland was improved with the introduction of the Douglas DC-3. A total of six were purchased, which remained in service with the airline until 1972. Until the late 1960s, Flugfélag concentrated mostly on domestic service, but it also continued operating internationally; in 1948, the Douglas DC-4 was introduced on international routes, and in 1957, two new Vickers 759 Viscounts were acquired, the first turboprop airliners to be operated by an Icelandic airline. In the 1950s, Flugfélag began to use Icelandair branding for flights beyond Iceland.

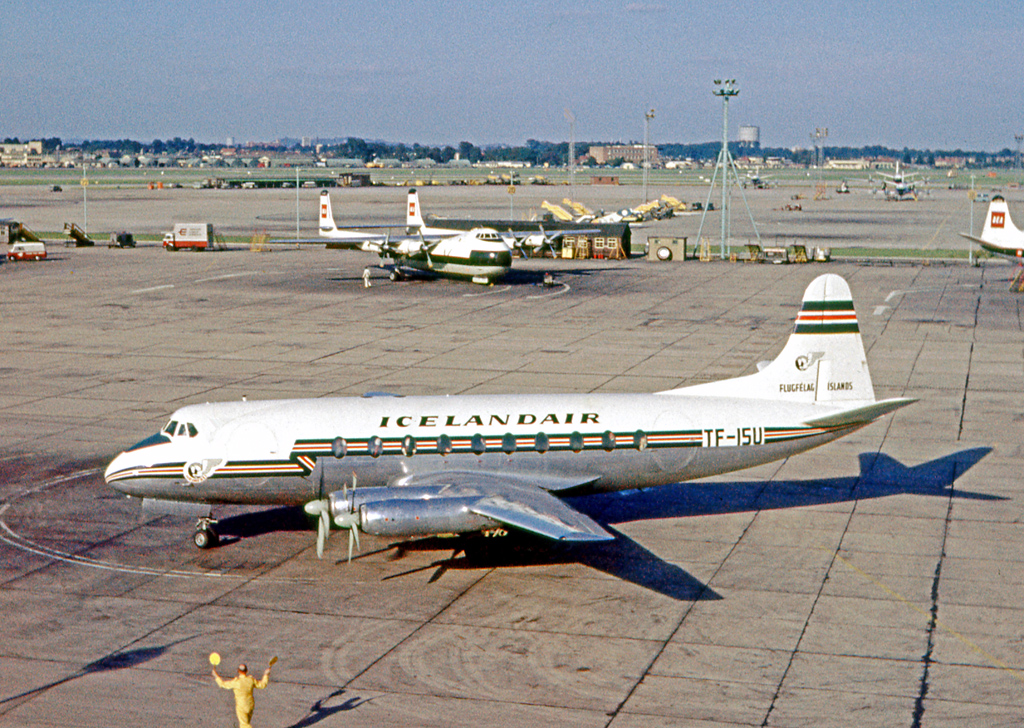
Flugfélag Íslands Vickers Viscount at London Heathrow Airport in 1962

In 1967, Flugfélag was the first Icelandic airline to join the jet age, when a Boeing 727-100 dubbed Gullfaxi was put into service. The B-727 jet aircraft was operated from Keflavík Airport, as the aircraft was considered too large for the smaller Reykjavík Airport. Most of Flugfélag's international operations transferred to Keflavík by this time. This left only shorter-distance flights to Greenland and the Faroes as the only international services from Reykjavík Airport. Another 727 was acquired in 1971, and the aircraft type was operated until 1990. In 2008, the cockpit section of Gullfaxi was put on display at the Akureyri Aviation Museum.

=== Loftleiðir ===
Another company, Loftleiðir, called Icelandic Airlines internationally, was formed in 1944 by three young pilots returning from their flight training in Canada. The company, whose name roughly means "Skyways", initially concentrated on Icelandic domestic routes using two Stinson Reliants and then a Grumman G-21 Goose amphibious aircraft.

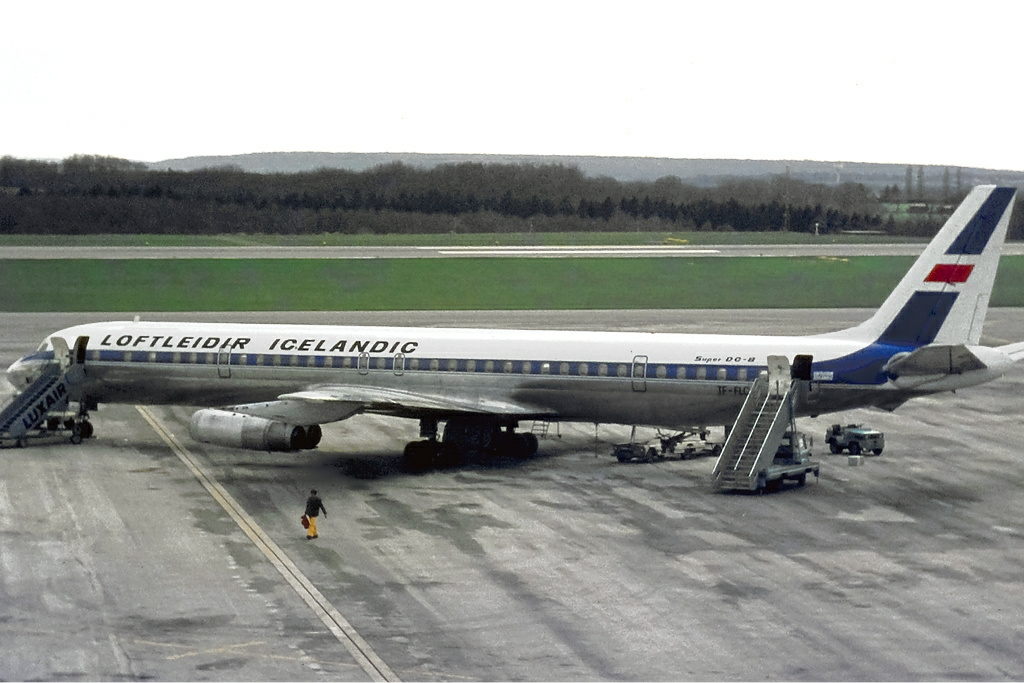
Loftleiðir Icelandic DC-8 aircraft at Luxembourg Airport in 1978

Loftleiðir began scheduled international operations in 1947 from a small shed on the east apron of Reykjavík Airport. Loftleiðir soon began challenging Flugfélag's dominance within Iceland; by 1952, the Icelandic authorities became concerned that the fierce domestic rivalry would cripple both companies, and attempted to force them to merge. Unable to consummate a merger, the authorities instead divided domestic routes between the two airlines, prompting Loftleiðir to exit the domestic market and concentrate instead on international flights. Its pioneering low-fare service across the North Atlantic commenced in 1953. Loftleiðir is considered a precursor to the low-cost carriers, that emerged worldwide in the 1970s, as it was not part of or subject to IATA fares or rules. Loftleiðir, anticipating increased demand, began construction of a large passenger terminal at Reykjavík Airport.

The late 1960s were an exciting time for Loftleiðir. In 1964, the airline acquired Canadair CL-44 aircraft, which were the largest transatlantic aircraft operating at the time. As a result of the large size of the new aircraft, Loftleiðir moved its entire operation to Keflavík Airport in the same year, abandoning Reykjavík Airport completely. The planned passenger terminal at Reykjavik Airport later became a hotel and headquarters for Loftleiðir. It continued to house the headquarters of Icelandair until 2024. The Loftleiðir hotel was operated under the Icelandair brand until 2022.

In 1969, the company acquired International Air Bahama, a small Bahamian airline that operated transatlantic nonstop service between Nassau and Luxembourg using Douglas DC-8 jetliners, and a year later, Loftleiðir became one of the founders of Cargolux, a cargo airline. Also in 1970, Loftleiðir entered the jet age with its first two DC-8 aircraft.

During those years, many people including the company's own staff called Loftleiðir "the Hippie Airline" or "the Hippie Express". The airline was not known for speed or punctuality, but flying with the company became a sort of rite of passage for young "hippies" from America travelling to Europe, one of whom was future U.S. president Bill Clinton.

=== Merger with Loftleiðir ===
During the 1970s energy crisis, the economic situation for both Flugfélag Íslands and Loftleiðir worsened. The government of Iceland initiated a new attempt to merge the two airlines, and this was successful in 1973 following lengthy and difficult negotiations, A holding company called Flugleiðir was created, which combined the two companies and began to streamline staff and operations.

In 1975, the Icelandic government provided a $13.5 million loan to Flugleiðir. The staff of Loftleiðir complained that Flugfélag Íslands, although smaller, had gained the upper hand in the united company. At the time of the merger, international transatlantic crossings made up two-thirds of the passenger traffic of the airline, and the fleet of Douglas DC-3s and Boeing 727s of Flugfélag Íslands was joined by the Douglas DC-8s of Loftleiðir. In 1979, the two airlines Flugfélag Íslands and Loftleiðir merged into one airline, Flugleiðir ("Flight Routes"), and the airline was renamed as Icelandair.

=== Post-merger Icelandair ===
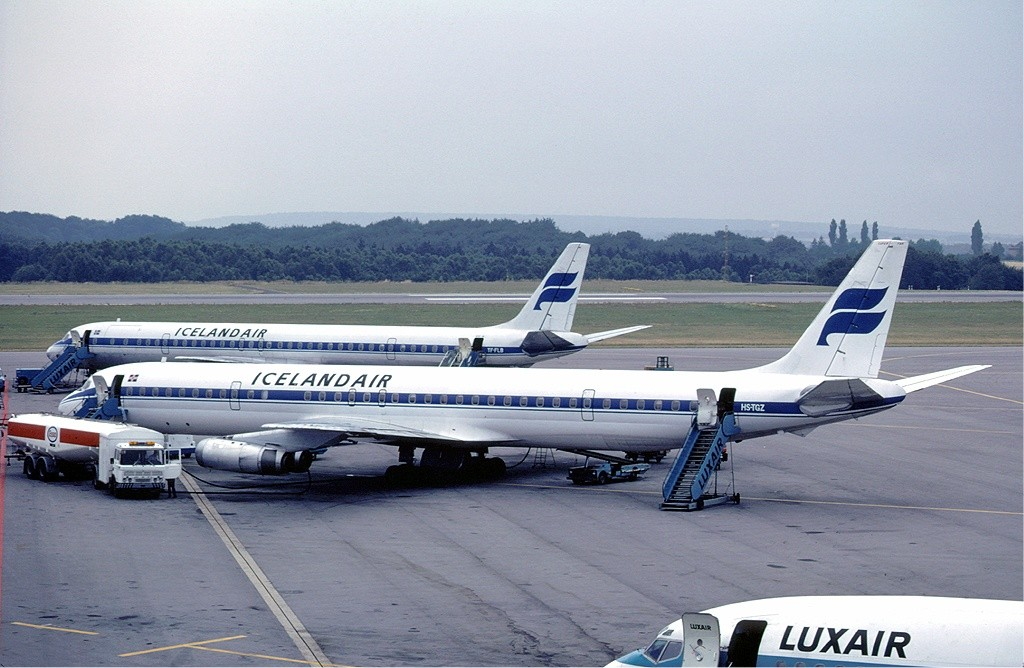
A pair of Icelandair Douglas DC-8s at Luxembourg-Findel Airport in 1983

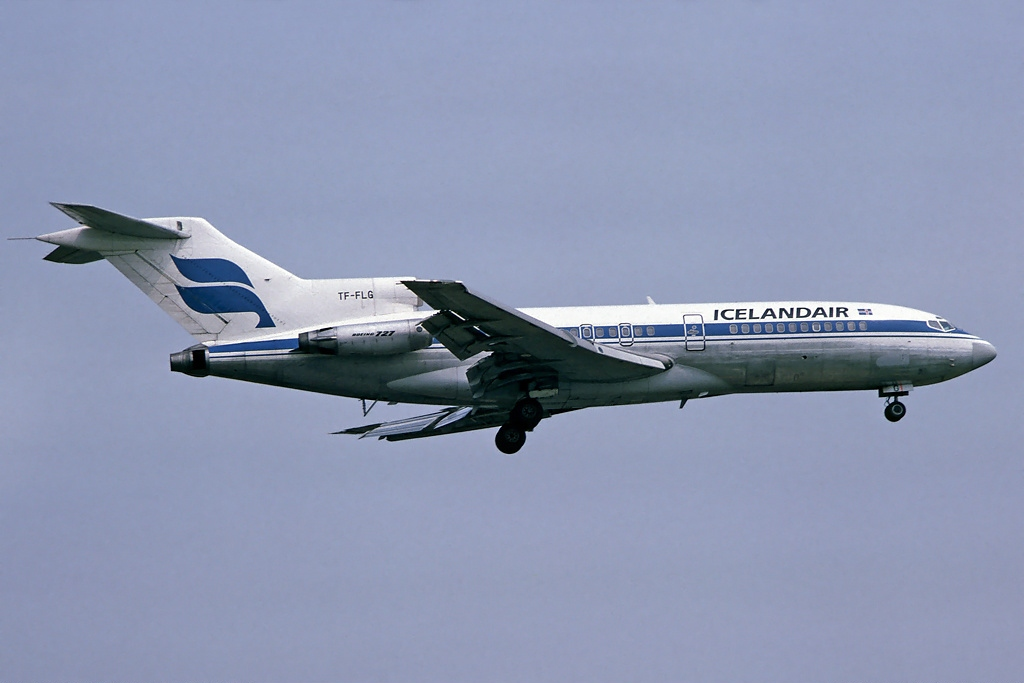
Icelandair Boeing 727, 1983

In 1980, the Icelandic government provided a loan to Icelandair due to the company's bad financial situation.

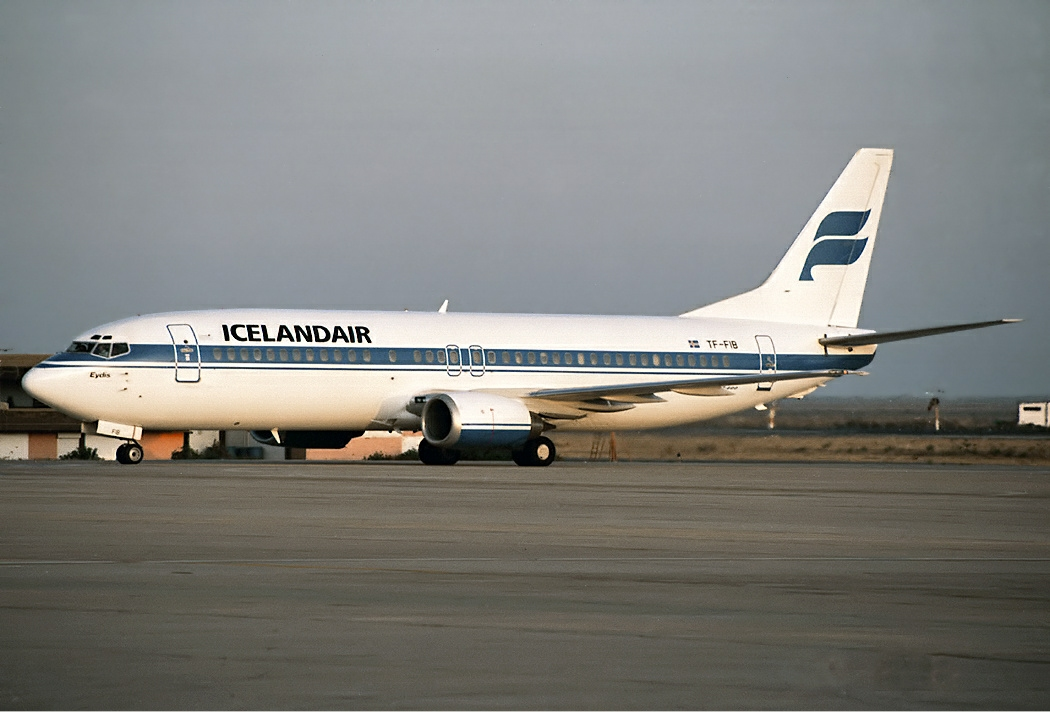
Icelandair Boeing 737-400 at Faro Airport in 1992

The aircraft fleet of Icelandair remained mainly unchanged until the Boeing 757-200 became the new backbone for transatlantic flights during the 1990s. The domestic Fokker F27s were replaced by Fokker 50s and Boeing 737s deployed on European routes. The European hub at Luxembourg Airport had been taken over from Loftleiðir. Passenger count topped one million in 1997 as the company's business grew on a reputation as a "backpacker airline", similar to Loftleiðir, which had been referred to as "Hippie Airline" since the late 1960s. In the same year, it was begun to dismantle the Luxembourg hub in favour of today's decentralized European network, linking the largest cities non-stop to Reykjavík, closing it down altogether by 1999.

In 1997, the domestic operations of Icelandair, part of which had previously been operated under the 'Flugfélag Nordurlands' branding, were combined with a small airline Nordurflug to form the Air Iceland (Icelandic: Flugfélag Íslands) subsidiary, allowing mainline Icelandair to fully concentrate on international flights since then. On 20 November 1999, a new aircraft livery was introduced, as part of an image campaign designed to retire Icelandair's "backpacker" label in favour of an emphasis on business travel.

=== Development in the early 2000s ===
In 2001, the Icelandair hub was moved to Keflavík International Airport. As Icelandair particularly focuses on flights to North America, the company was significantly affected by the airspace closure following the September 11 attacks in the same year. The Flugleiðir holding was reorganized as Icelandair Group (for aviation business) and FL Group (for non-aviation finance and investment business) between 2002 and 2005, with Icelandair becoming the largest and most important of eleven subsidiaries. The wet-lease and charter department, which was founded in 2003, was named Loftleiðir Icelandic, thus re-introducing a familiar name.

Icelandair was hit by the 2008 financial crisis in the country and was further impacted by a volcanic eruption in 2010. Air traffic restrictions following the 2010 eruptions of Eyjafjallajökull resulted in large parts of the European airspace being closed down. The air travel disruption coincided with the start of the important summer season for the company. The in-house crisis management organisation began assessing the situation once the scale of the problem had become known. Thrice-daily crisis meetings were held at the airline's headquarters. Icelandair tried to operate as many passenger flights as possible, keeping its hub at Keflavík open and diverting European flights to airports that were still open. The eventual closure of Keflavík due to the volcanic ash cloud coincided with an improvement in the situation towards Europe, which allowed Icelandair to move its headquarters with 200 staff to Glasgow and operate flights from there for ten days, with shuttle flights to Iceland's Akureyri Airport and round-the-clock bus shuttles onwards to Reykjavík.

In the aftermath of the eruption, the government of Iceland launched the successful "Inspired by Iceland" campaign to regain confidence in travelling to Iceland for tourists and business people, of which Icelandair was a leading participant and initiator.

When the Grímsvötn volcano erupted in 2011, Icelandair once again had to cope with airspace closures in Europe. However, this time to a lesser extent due to a higher level of political preparedness. Weekly newspaper The Economist claimed that Icelandair could even take advantage when catering for disaster tourists.

In February 2011, Icelandair was chosen "The Knowledge Company" of the year, and Icelandair CEO Birkir Hólm Guðnason was picked as "Man of the Year" in the Icelandic business community. In both categories, the panel of judges of the Association of Economists and Business Graduates in Iceland said that "the fine results of the company in the previous year showed both a high degree of skill and specialist knowledge within the company as well as excellent leadership." In October of the same year, the airline was awarded the title "Marketing Firm of the Year in Iceland", by a judging panel from IMARK, the Marketing Association in Iceland.

Icelandair Info, the inflight magazine of Icelandair, was printed four times a year in Icelandic and English from 2008 until 2020. It also contained the product catalogue for the airline's Saga Shop, now a separate magazine.

Icelandair moved its headquarters to Hafnarfjörður in 2024, to consolidate its offices under one roof. Their previous headquarters at Reykjavík Airport were in use for over 50 years, having been built by Loftleiðir.

After having launched scheduled flights to Washington, D.C., in 2011, Denver was announced as a new U.S. destination for 2012, followed by Anchorage in 2013, bringing the total number of cities served in the country up to eight, along with Boston, Minneapolis, New York City, Orlando and Seattle. Also in 2012, Icelandair introduced flights linking Akureyri to its Keflavík hub through subsidiary company Air Iceland.

From 2009 to 2014, operations doubled. Twice-weekly flights to Vancouver commenced on 13 May 2014 and continued until October of that year. Flights to Edmonton started on 4 March 2014, with a year-round service operating five times a week. The Geneva service started on 24 May 2014 and continued twice weekly until September.

On 9 December 2014, Icelandair revealed a northern lights-themed Boeing 757-200 (registration TF-FIU) named Hekla Aurora. The exterior features artwork depicting an Icelandic winter scene and LED mood lighting emulating the Aurora Borealis.

On 5 February 2015, Birmingham became Icelandair's 5th gateway in the UK, and the 39th overall, with flights operating twice weekly, on Thursdays and Mondays. On 19 May 2015, Icelandair launched scheduled flights to and from Portland, Oregon in the US: its 14th destination in North America. Flights were set to operate twice weekly, on Tuesdays and Thursdays, until 20 October. Further expansion of Icelandair's global network was announced on 12 May 2015 with new, year-round services from Chicago O'Hare International Airport. Services commenced on 16 March 2016, with flights to Iceland operating four days a week. On 17 August 2015, Icelandair announced the augmentation of its global flight network with a new service between Keflavik and Aberdeen, the company's second Scottish destination. The new service, operated by Air Iceland Connect (a subsidiary of Icelandair Group), commenced in March of the following year, with flights scheduled four times per week.

Icelandair commenced scheduled flights to Paris Orly Airport beginning on 29 March 2016. Services to Montréal–Trudeau Airport began on 26 May 2016. In September 2016, Icelandair announced services to Philadelphia, US, starting in May 2017 and Tampa, US starting in Sep 2017.

In May 2017, Icelandair unveiled a glacier-themed special livery on Boeing 757-200 (registration TF-FIR) named Vatnajökull, the name of Europe's largest glacier. The special livery was created to commemorate Icelandair's 80th anniversary. In August 2017, Icelandair announced service five days per week to Cleveland, US, which began on 16 May 2018. The route was cut in early 2019. The airline offered Economy Comfort until April 2018.

On 9 January 2018, Icelandair announced that it would provide three non-stop flights a week from Kansas City International Airport to Keflavík International Airport, which commenced on 25 May 2018. Icelandair commenced four weekly flights to and from Dallas Fort Worth on 30 May 2018. It ended on 6 March 2019.

On 5 November 2018, Icelandair announced plans to take over its low-cost competitor, Wow Air, with the two airlines to be operated as separate brands. On 29 November, Icelandair abandoned this endeavour as the shareholders' meeting pre-conditions were unlikely to be met.

=== Since 2020 ===
On 18 September 2020, the company's share capital was increased with the issue of 23,000,000,000 new shares with a nominal value of 1 Icelandic króna following a public share offering. In addition, the Icelandic government decided to guarantee a line of credit for Icelandair. The guarantee amounts to $120 million. On 16 March 2021, domestic flights operated by Air Iceland Connect (a wholly owned subsidiary of the Icelandair Group) merged under Icelandair branding while retaining its existing air operator's certificate. The head office moved to Hafnarfjörður in 2024.

Icelandair announced the launch of a new route to Istanbul, operating four times a week beginning 5 September 2025. In January 2025, Icelandair was reported to be launching a non-stop flight between Reykjavik and Miami with three weekly flights starting in January 2026. The route will be serviced by its Airbus A321LR aircraft. In October 2025, Icelandair announced it would accelerate the retirement of all their Boeing 757 and 767 aircraft to reduce costs. The aircraft will be phased out by 2026.

== Inflight service ==
=== Cabins ===
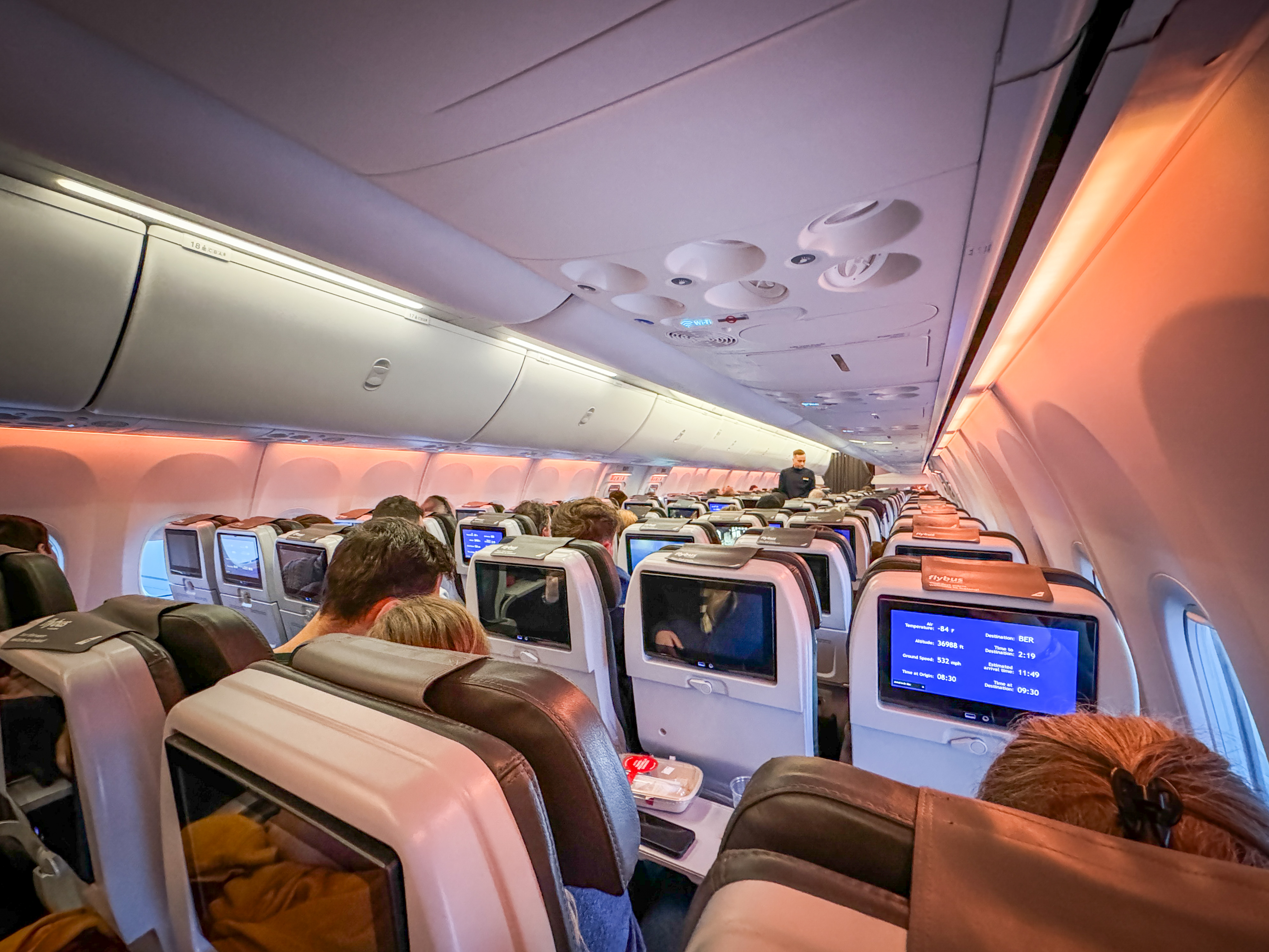
Economy cabin aboard an Icelandair Boeing 737 MAX 8

Icelandair offers two booking classes: Economy and Saga Premium. All of Icelandair's aircraft are equipped with a free-of-charge VOD in-flight entertainment system that includes seatback touch-screen monitors for each passenger. Saga Premium (similar to business class) was introduced in 1984.

Icelandair has a tradition of playing Icelandic music during the boarding process. In 2013, Icelandic band Sigur Rós debuted its album Valtari exclusively onboard Icelandair's aircraft, two months before the album's general release. Biophilia, Björk's 2011 album, had earlier been released on Icelandair's fleet in the same way.

Limited services are provided aboard Icelandair's Dash- 8 aircraft used for domestic/Faroe Islands and some Greenland routes. There is no Saga Premium, IFE system or Wi-Fi available and the food/beverage menu is limited. On domestic services, only water and chocolate is provided due to short flight durations of 45 minutes.

==== Economy ====
Complimentary drinks including coffee, tea and water are available on all flights. A buy on board service offering snacks, lights meals, soft drinks and alcoholic drinks is available in economy class. A wider range of freshly prepared meals can be pre-ordered before departure. A free VOD in-flight entertainment system is available for each passenger and Wi-Fi is available for a fee in economy class.

==== Saga Premium ====
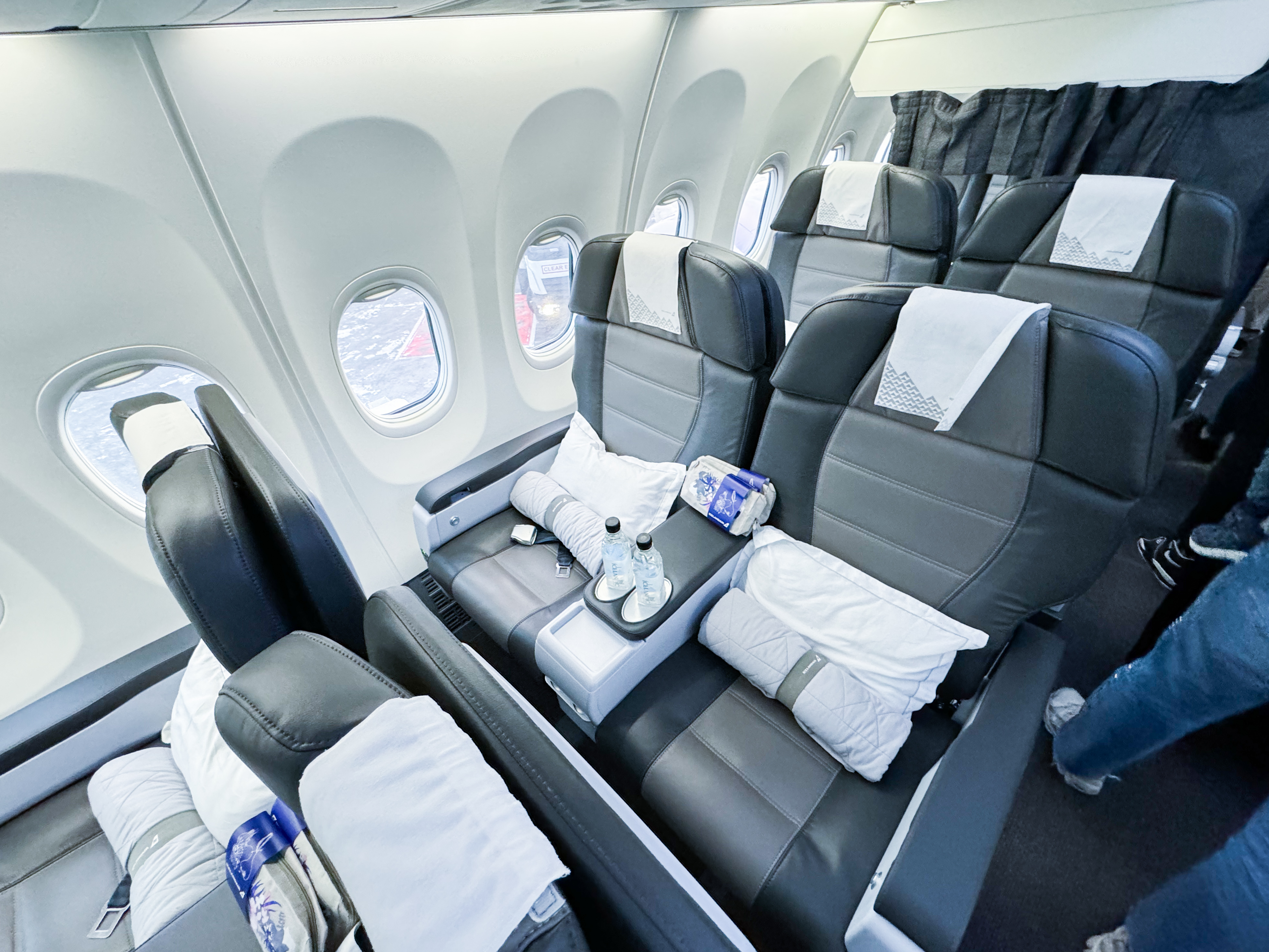
Icelandair Saga Premium cabin on a Boeing 737 MAX 8

Icelandair's Saga Premium has similarities between a U.S. domestic first class product and an international long-haul premium economy product. It has dedicated wide 2-2 seating (but without lie-flat beds) and includes a premium meal service, including alcoholic beverages. An amenity kit, video inflight entertainment system and free Wi-Fi service is also provided.

=== Frequent-flyer programme ===
Icelandair's frequent-flyer programme is Saga Club, a programme where members can earn Saga points for travelling on Icelandair or partner airlines, and redeem points toward travel or Saga Shop inflight purchases. As of January 2021, Alaska Airlines and JetBlue are the only partner airlines of Icelandair eligible to earn Saga points through Saga Club, while Alaska Airlines is the only partner airline that allows for redeeming points towards travel.

== Destinations ==
Icelandair flies between Iceland and several destinations across Europe and North America. A few of these destinations are seasonal. Since the 1960s, Icelandair has offered passengers travelling on transatlantic flights between North America and Europe an opportunity to stopover in Iceland for up to seven days, at no additional cost.

=== Codeshare agreements ===
Icelandair codeshares with the following airlines:

- Aegean Airlines
- Air Greenland
- airBaltic
- Air India
- Alaska Airlines
- Atlantic Airways
- Emirates
- Finnair
- ITA Airways
- JetBlue
- Scandinavian Airlines
- TAP Air Portugal
- Turkish Airlines

=== Interline agreements ===
Icelandair has interline agreements with over 70 airlines, including:

- Hahn Air
- Loganair
- My Freighter Airlines
- Porter Airlines
- Southwest Airlines
- Sun Country Airlines
- Swiss International Air Lines
- WestJet

== Fleet ==
=== Current fleet ===
As of November 2025, Icelandair operates the following aircraft, and most of the aircraft in Icelandair's fleet are named after Icelandic volcanoes.

Icelandair fleet
Aircraft	In service	Orders	Passengers			Notes
Aircraft	In service	Orders	J	Y	Total	Notes
Airbus A320-200	1	—	16	138	154	Leased from June 2026 due to Airbus A321LR delivery delays.
Airbus A320neo	—	10	16	138	154	
Airbus A321LR	6	3	22	165	187	Replacing Boeing 757-200 and Boeing 767-300ER.
Airbus A321XLR	—	13	TBA			Order with 12 options. Deliveries begin in 2029. Replacing Boeing 757-200 and Boeing 767-300ER.
Boeing 737 MAX 8	17	—	16	144	160	
Boeing 737 MAX 9	4	—	20	156	176	
Boeing 757-200	6	—	22	161	183	To be retired in 2026. To be replaced by Airbus A321LR and Airbus A321XLR.
Boeing 757-200	6	—	20	164	184	To be retired in 2026. To be replaced by Airbus A321LR and Airbus A321XLR.
Boeing 767-300ER	2	—	25	237	262	Retirement brought forward to January 2027. To be replaced by Airbus A321LR and Airbus A321XLR.
De Havilland Canada Dash 8-200	3	—	—	37	37	Transferred from Air Iceland Connect.
De Havilland Canada Dash 8-400	3	—	—	76	76	Transferred from Air Iceland Connect.
Total	42	26				

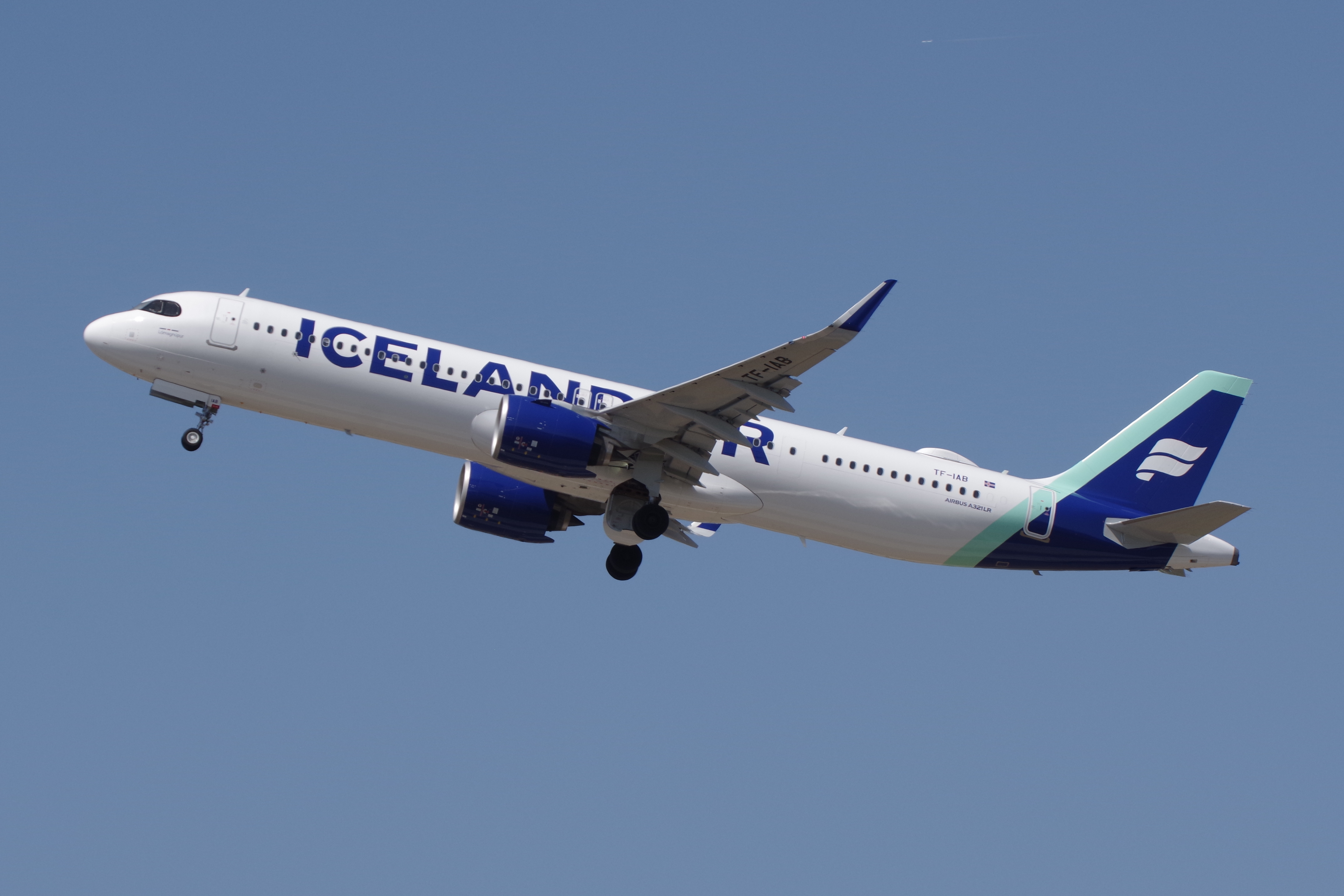
Airbus A321LR

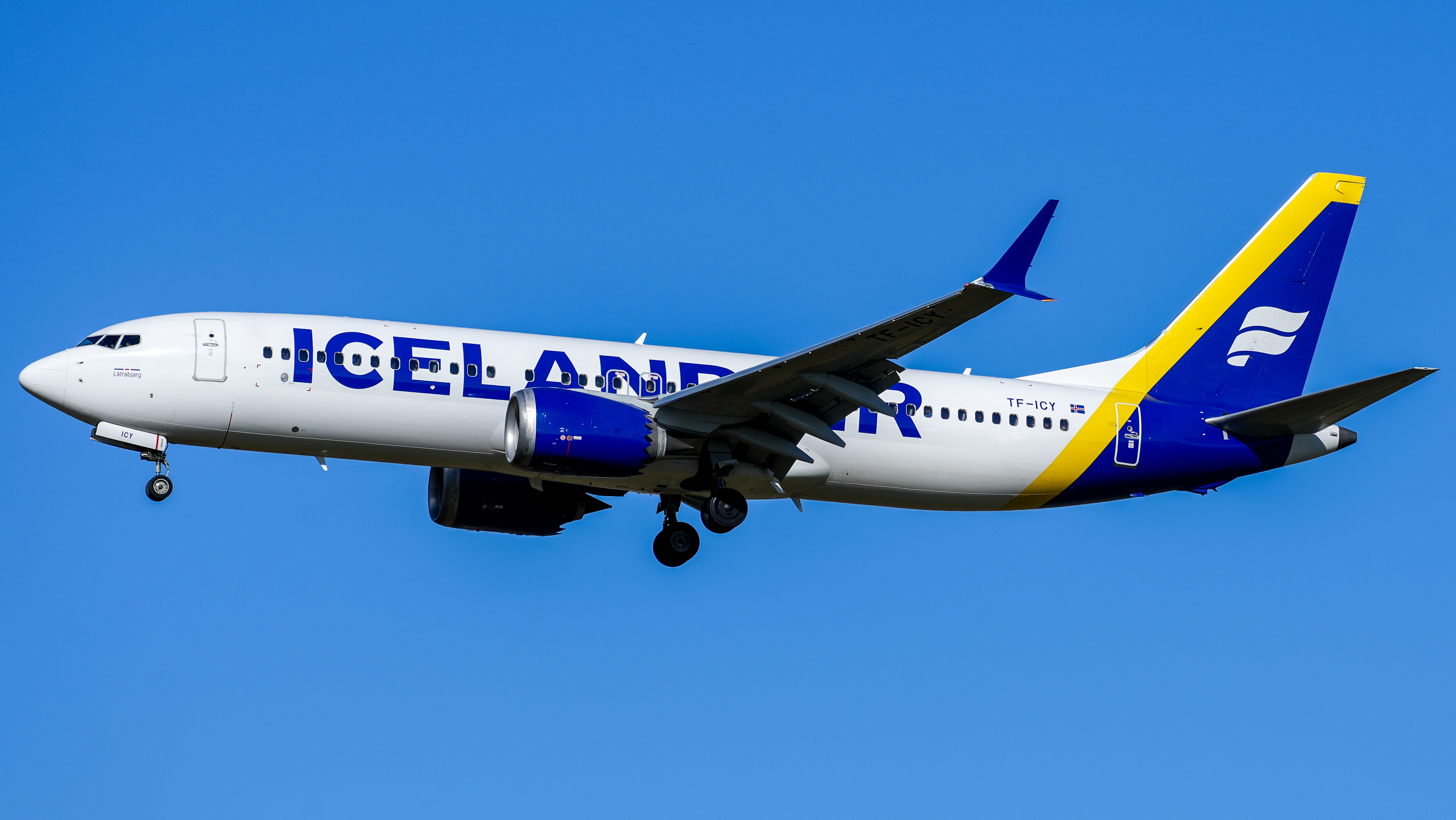
Boeing 737 MAX 8

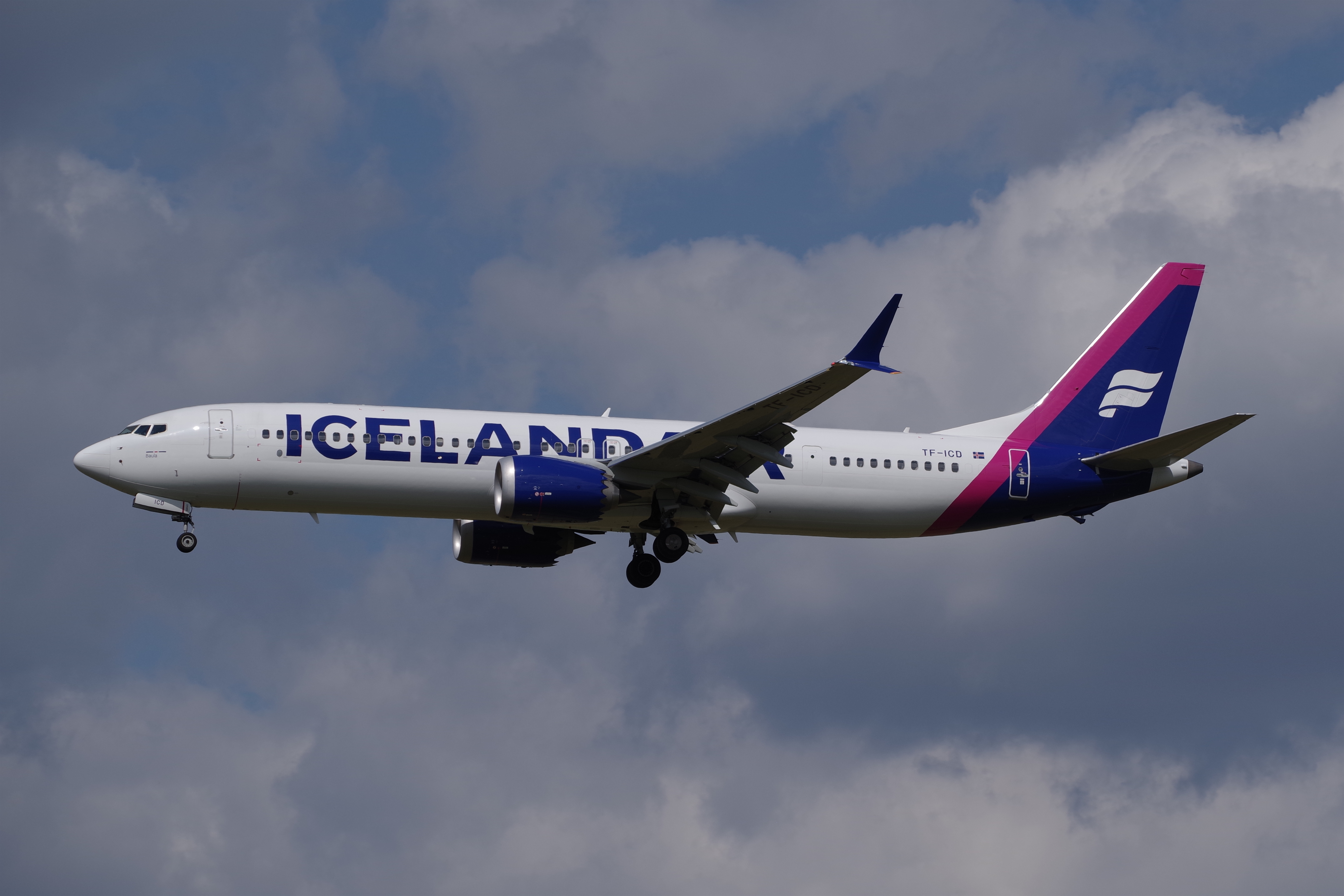
Boeing 737 MAX 9

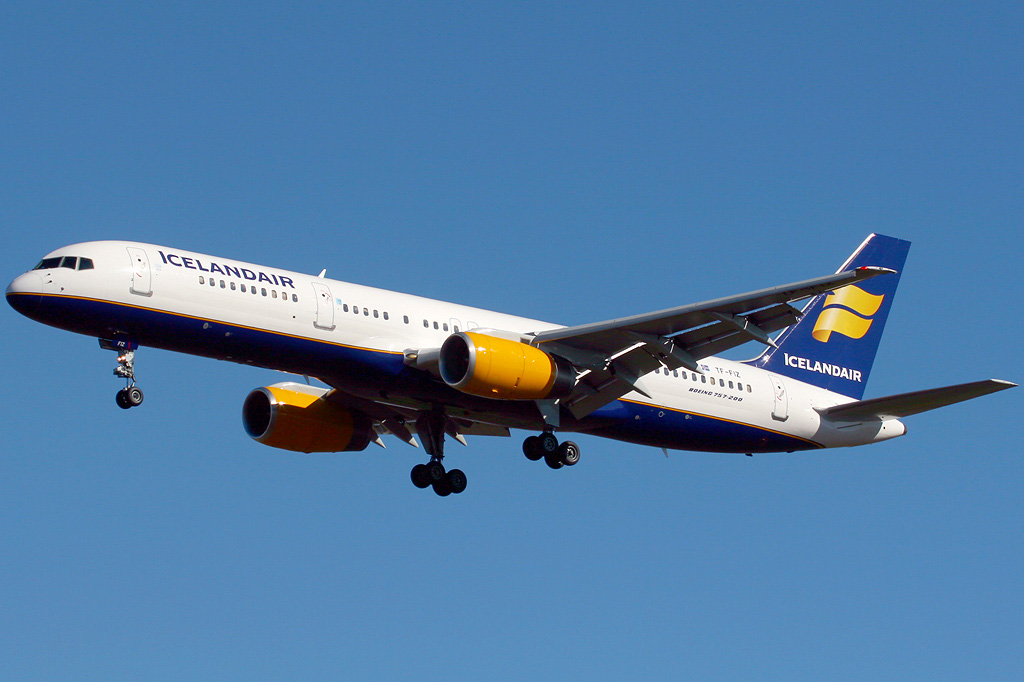
Boeing 757-200

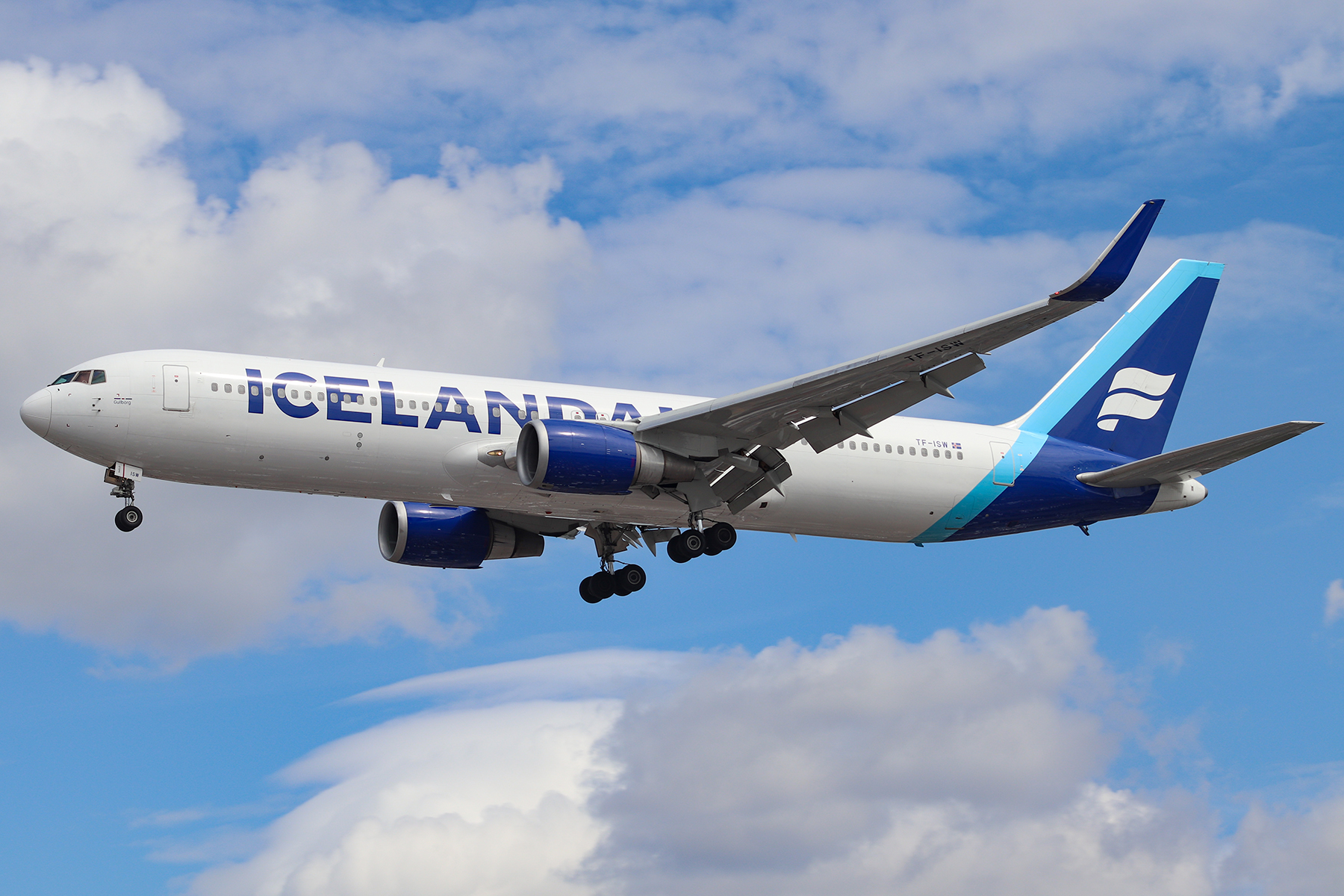
Boeing 767-300ER

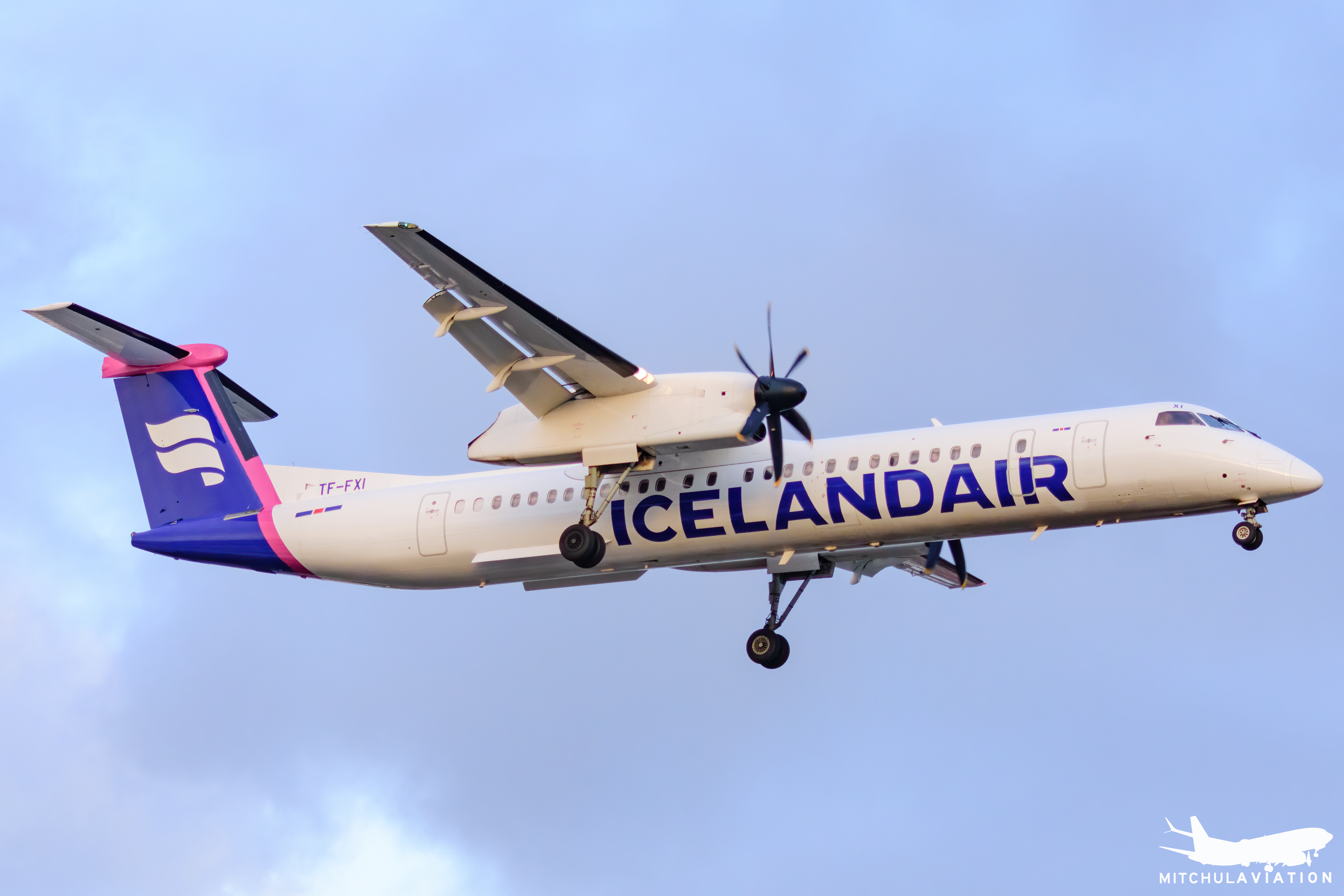
De Havilland Canada Dash 8-400

=== Fleet development ===
In 2005, the airline, on behalf of its parent company Icelandair Group, announced an order for ten Boeing 737-800 aircraft with options for five more. Those options were later exercised. These were not placed into service by the airline but leased to other airlines. During that same year, Icelandair announced an order for two Boeing 787 Dreamliner aircraft. In 2006, Icelandair announced an order for two more Boeing 787 aircraft. In 2011, it was announced that orders for three of the 787s had been cancelled.

On 13 February 2013, Icelandair Group announced that the company had finalized an order with Boeing for 16 new Boeing 737 MAX aircraft. Purchase rights for eight additional 737 aircraft were also signed. The value for all 16 aircraft was US$1.6 billion at Boeing list prices, but the actual purchase price was confidential. The aircraft were scheduled to be delivered in 2018–2021. The order was for nine 737 MAX 8 aircraft configured for 153 passengers, and seven 737 MAX 9 aircraft to hold 172 passengers. Icelandair Group's current Boeing 757-200 aircraft hold 183 passengers.

On 8 May 2019, Icelandair announced that the company was considering ordering the Airbus A321neo and Airbus A321LR as a replacement for their ageing fleet of Boeing 757s, or to run alongside their Boeing 737 MAX 8 or to even replace their MAX 8 aircraft entirely, due to the Boeing 737 MAX groundings.

On 22 January 2020, Icelandair announced that the airline would lease three Boeing 737-800 airliners to enter service in spring 2020. The aircraft were to be dry leased and flown by Icelandair pilots. However, this never took place. On 12 August 2020, Icelandair reached a settlement with Boeing over the MAX groundings. The settlement included reducing the carrier's order for future MAX aircraft by four.

On 7 April 2023, Icelandair announced that the airline had signed an MOU for an order of up to 25 A321XLR aircraft: 13 firm orders with 12 further options. At the same time, it was also announced that negotiations were underway to lease four A321LRs. These will replace its ageing Boeing 757 fleet. This will be the first-ever Airbus order for the Icelandic flag carrier. The first Airbus A321LR was delivered on 2 December 2024.

In December 2024, Icelandair's two Boeing 757-300 aircraft were wet-leased to Flykhiva of Uzbekistan.

On 29 April 2025, Icelandair announced that the airline would retire their Boeing 767-300ER by autumn 2029. However, in October 2025, it was announced that the retirement date for the Boeing 767 will now be in 2026, three years earlier than scheduled.

=== Special liveries ===
Icelandair have painted three Boeing 757s in distinctive special liveries.

TF-FIU "Hekla Aurora", a Boeing 757-200, highlighted the Aurora Borealis (Northern Lights). This aircraft was officially retired on 12 October 2025 and flew its last commercial flight between Copenhagen and Reykjavík on 14 October 2025.

Another Boeing 757-200, registered TF-FIR, was painted in a special "80 Years of Icelandic Aviation" livery depicting its namesake, the Vatnajökull glacier. Its final revenue flight was between London-Heathrow and Reykjavík on 21 September 2025.

TF-ISX "Þingvellir", a Boeing 757-300, was painted in the red, white, and blue livery of Iceland's flag and celebrated both the 100th anniversary of Icelandic independence (1918–2018) and the 2018 FIFA World Cup which Iceland qualified for. This aircraft was retired from the Icelandair fleet in October 2024.

Icelandair special liveries
Registration	Livery	Aircraft	Refs
TF-FIU	Hekla Aurora	Boeing 757-200	
TF-FIR	Vatnajökull	Boeing 757-200	
TF-ISX	100 years of Independence	Boeing 757-300	

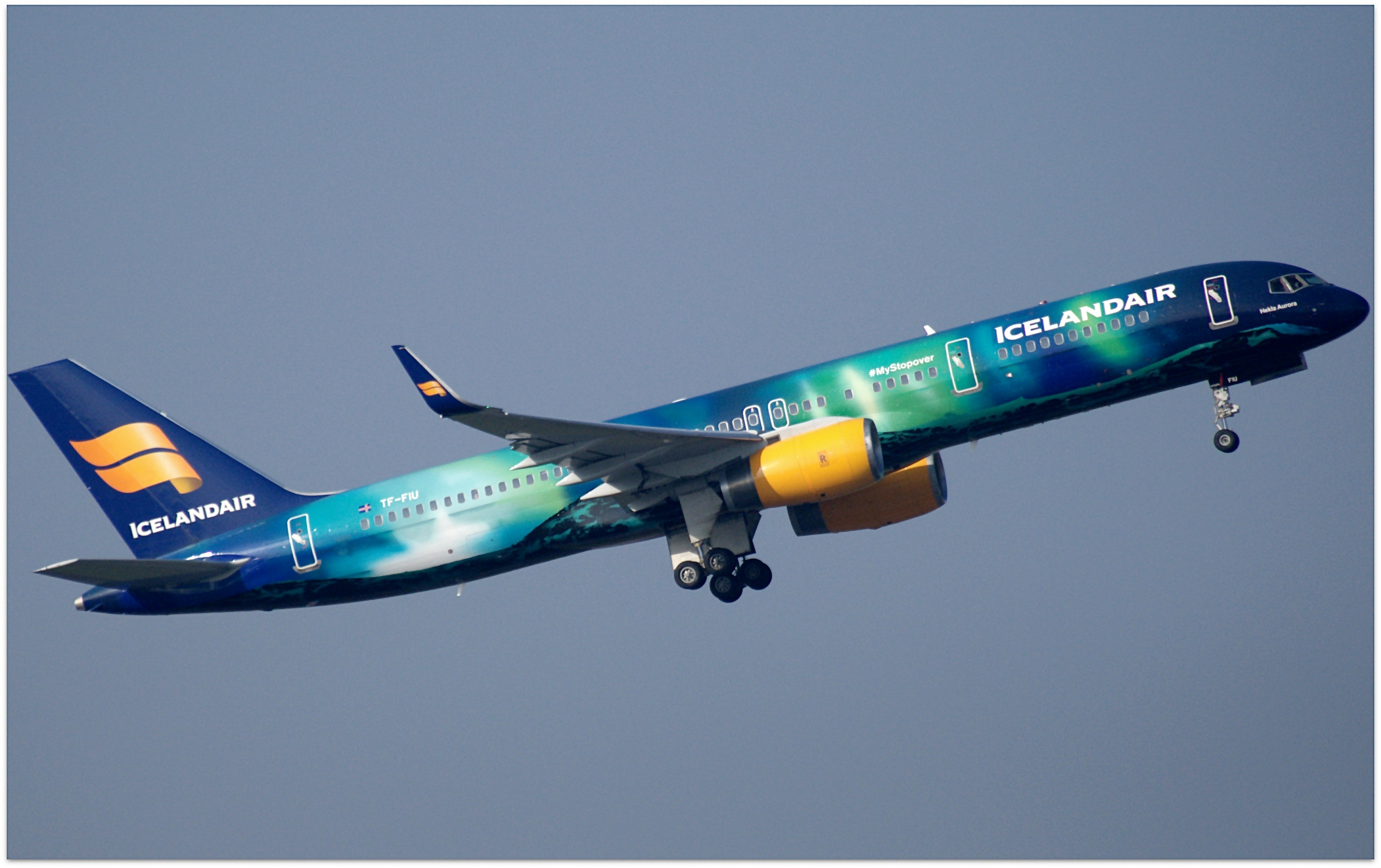
TF-FIU in Hekla Aurora livery

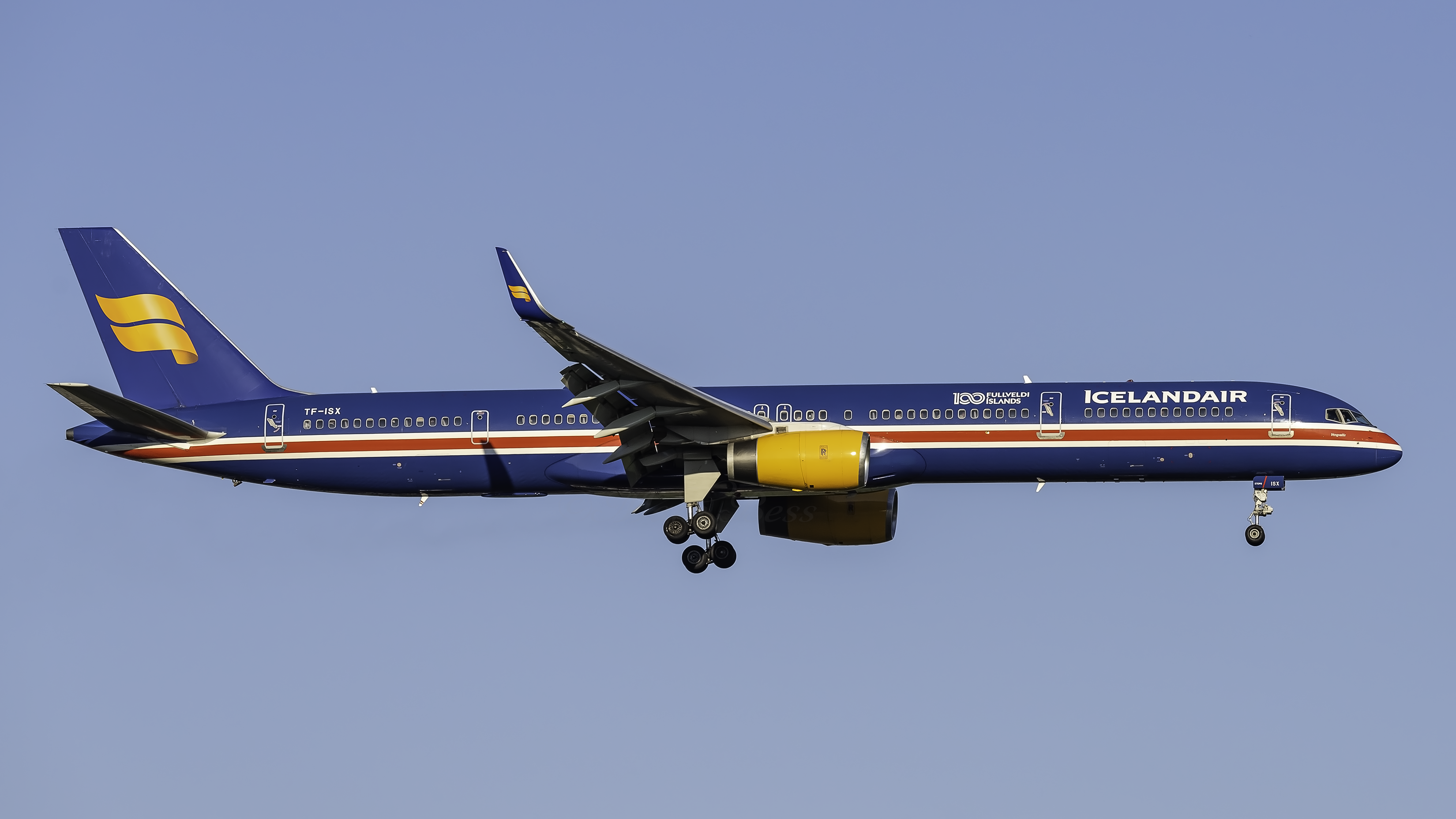
TF-ISX in 100 Years of Icelandic Independence livery

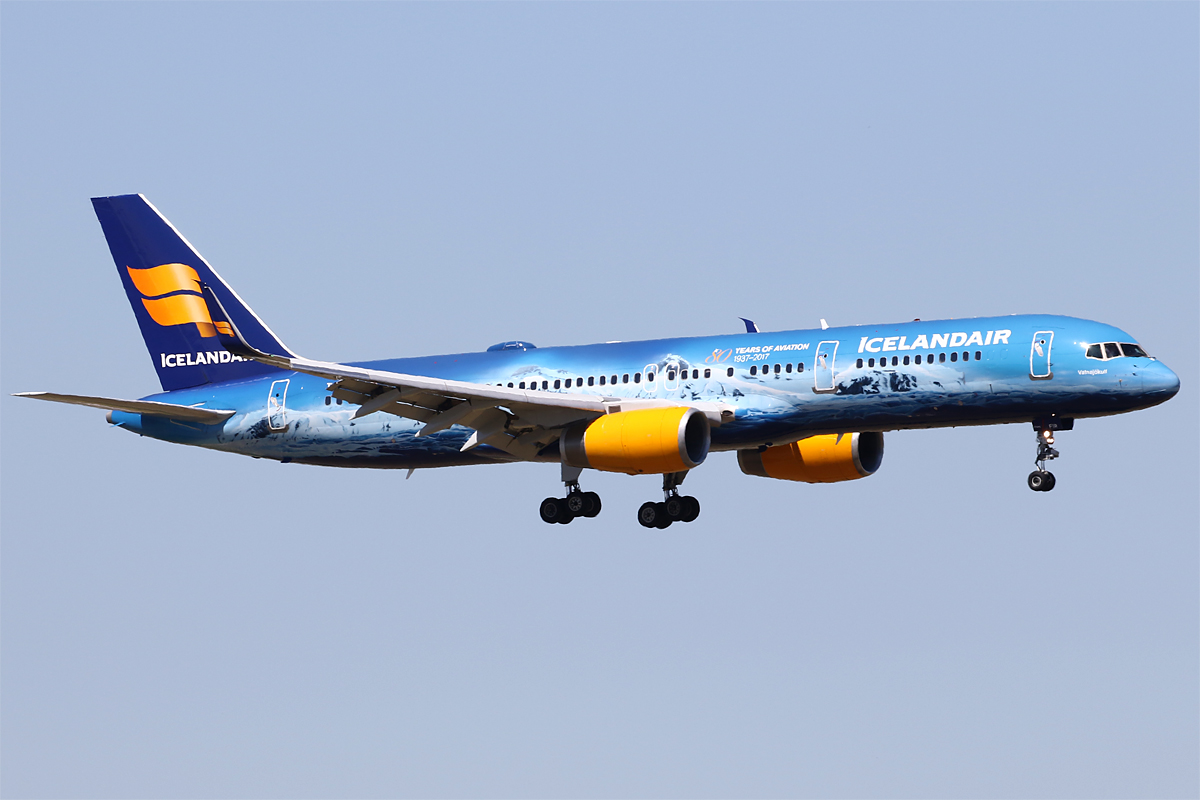
TF-FIR in 80 Years of Icelandic Aviation livery

=== Historical fleet ===
Over the years, Icelandair operated the following aircraft types:

Icelandair historical fleet
Aircraft	Total	Introduced	Retired	Notes
Airbus A319-100	1	2019	2019	Leased from GetJet Airlines.
Avro Anson	2	1944	Unknown	Transferred from Loftleiðir.
Beechcraft Model 18	2	1942	1948	Originally Flugfélag Íslands.
Boeing 727-100C	3	1967	1989	Originally Flugfélag Íslands.
Boeing 727-200	2	1980	1990	
Boeing 737-300	3	1991	2004	
Boeing 737-400	5	1989	2001	
Boeing 747-100	1	1982	1982	Leased from SAS.
Boeing 747-100	1	1984	1984	Leased from SAS.
Boeing 757-300	2	2002	2025	Sold to Flykhiva in April 2025.
Canadair CL-44	5	1964	1979	Transferred from Loftleiðir.
Consolidated PBY Catalina	5	1944	1960	Originally Flugfélag Íslands.
De Havilland Dragon Rapide	2	1945	1955	Originally Flugfélag Íslands.
De Havilland Canada DHC-6 Twin Otter	1	1981	2007	
Douglas C-47 Skytrain	10	1946	1970	Originally Flugfélag Íslands.
Douglas C-47 Skytrain	1	2005	2015	Operated by the Flugfarid Museum.
Douglas C-54 Skymaster	11	1947	1967	Originally Flugfélag Íslands.
Douglas DC-6B	7	1959	1975	
Douglas DC-8-33	1	1977	1978	
Douglas DC-8-55	1	1986	1988	Transferred from Loftleiðir.
Douglas DC-8-55CF	1	1971	1973	Leased from Seaboard World Airlines.
Douglas DC-8-61CF	3	1973	1975	Leased from Seaboard World Airlines.
Douglas DC-8-63	15	1981	1990	Transferred from Loftleiðir.
Douglas DC-8-63CF	7	1979	1985	
Douglas DC-8-63PF	1	1982	1982	Leased from SAS.
Douglas DC-8-71	1	1983	1985	
Fokker F27 Friendship	14	1965	1992	Domestic/Faroe/Greenland service.
Fokker 50	4	1992	2015	Domestic/Faroe/Greenland service.
Grumman G-21 Goose	7	1946	1967	Transferred from Loftleiðir.
Lockheed L-749 Constellation	1	1960	1960	Leased from Miami Airlines.
McDonnell Douglas DC-10-30CF	1	1979	1980	Leased from Seaboard World Airlines.
Noorduyn Norseman	2	1945	1946	Transferred from Loftleiðir and written off.
Stinson Reliant	2	1944	1952	Originally Loftleiðir.
Vickers Viscount 700D	2	1957	1970	Originally Flugfélag Íslands.
WACO YKS-7	2	1938	1943	Both were written off.

== Icelandair Cargo ==
=== Overview ===
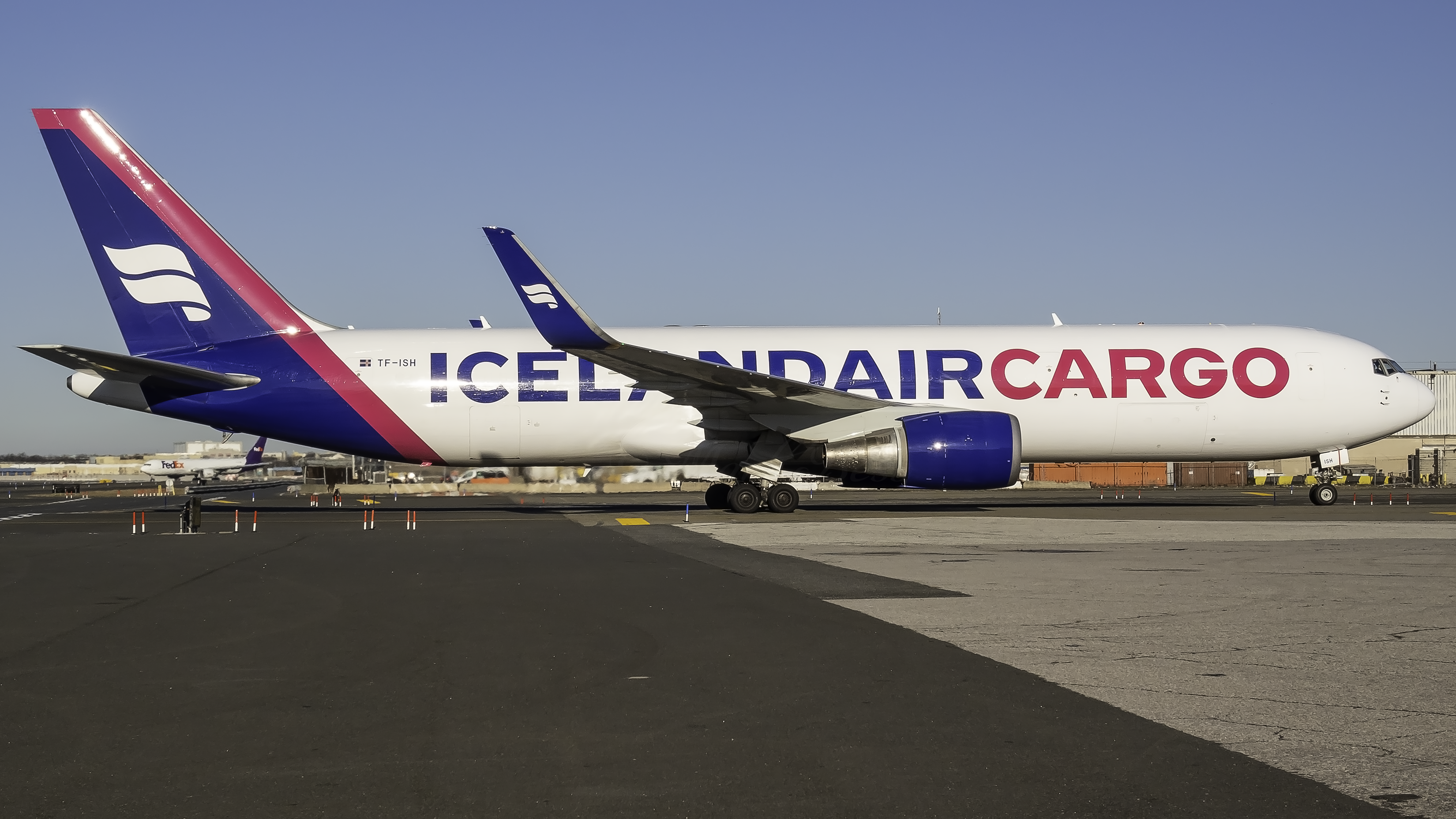
Icelandair Cargo Boeing 767-300BCF

Icelandair Cargo is a sister airline of Icelandair; it is Icelandair Group's cargo airline subsidiary. Flugfélag Íslands and Loftleiðir used their aircraft to carry freight as well as passengers, and when Icelandair was established in 1973, a freight division was set up within the airline. After years of operating freighter aircraft as part of Icelandair, Icelandair Cargo was established as a separate entity in 2000. The airline uses available space in the baggage compartments of Icelandair's passenger aircraft, as well as operating two Boeing 757 freighters to destinations in Europe and North America from its base at Keflavík International Airport.

In 2021, Icelandair Cargo announced Boeing 767-300ER passenger aircraft would be converted to freighters. The first converted 767-300BCF was delivered to Icelandair on 8 December 2022 with plans to use the increased capacity to establish new routes to the United States.

In May 2025 Icelandair Cargo has signed an interline agreement with Uzbekistan-based My Freighter Airlines to open up opportunities for cargo transportation between Central Asia, Europe and North America.

=== Fleet ===
As of April 2024, the Icelandair Cargo fleet consists of the following aircraft:

Icelandair Cargo fleet
Aircraft	In service	Orders	Notes
Boeing 767-300BCF	2	—	
Total	2	—	

== Sponsorships ==
Icelandair and the City of Reykjavík are two of the main sponsors of the Iceland Airwaves, an annual music festival held in Reykjavík on the first weekend in November.

== Accidents and incidents ==
- 29 May 1947 – A Flugfélag Islands Douglas DC-3 (registered as TF-ISI) crashed near Héðinsfjörður during a scheduled domestic flight from Reykjavík to Akureyri, killing the 21 passengers and four crew members on board. To date, this remains the worst aviation accident in Iceland.
- 7 March 1948 – An Avro Anson Mk5 belonging to Loftleiðir crashed on the mountain Skálafell en route from the Westmann Islands (Vestmannaeyjar) to Reykjavík, killing the pilot and the five passengers on board.
- 31 January 1951 – The 17 passengers and three crew members on board a DC-3, registered TF-ISG and named Glitfaxi, were killed when the aircraft crashed in the sea off the Icelandic coast near Hafnarfjörður in what became known as the Glitfaxi air crash. The pilots were attempting to land the aircraft at Reykjavík Airport in heavy snowfalls following a flight from Vestmannaeyjar when radar contact was lost.
- 14 April 1963 – A Vickers Viscount (registered TF-ISU) crashed on approach to Oslo-Fornebu Airport. All 12 people on board were killed.
- 26 September 1970 – A Flugfélag Fokker F27 Friendship (registered TF-FIL) crashed into a mountain near Vágar, Faroe Islands while approaching Vágar Airport following a scheduled passenger flight from Bergen, in what is known as controlled flight into terrain. Of the 34 people on board, seven passengers and one crew member were killed.
- 15 November 1978 – Loftleiðir Flight 001, a Douglas DC-8 (registered TF-FLA), operating for Garuda Indonesia, missed the runway upon approach of Colombo Airport in Sri Lanka during a chartered Hajj pilgrimage flight from Jeddah and crashed. 181 passengers died in the accident, while 74 passengers and 5 crew members survived.
- 22 January 2002 – The crew of Icelandair Flight 315, a Boeing 757-200 registered TF-FIO with 75 passengers on board, unintentionally entered a series of extreme manoeuvres during a go-around from a low altitude following an unstabilised approach into Oslo Airport, Gardermoen. During the incident the aircraft was subjected to load factors over the design limits, culminating in a dive followed by a +3.59 g pull-up manoeuvre clearing the ground by only 321 ft. The speed limit for the flap configuration was also exceeded. Control was regained and a second approach was flown with the aircraft landing safely. The airliner was permitted to proceed on its subsequent scheduled flights without a technical inspection being conducted until 13 March of that year when its manufacturer Boeing recommended further maintenance work after having evaluated the readings from the flight data recorder. The Accident Investigation Board Norway, which led the investigation into the incident, made four safety recommendations, including one to the wider aviation community on operational procedures regarding discontinued approaches.
- 7 February 2020 – Icelandair Flight 529, a Boeing 757-200 registered TF-FIA, suffered a right-hand main landing gear collapse after landing on runway 10 at Keflavík International Airport, Iceland. There were no injuries among the 166 people on board.
