= Jakubov u Moravských Budějovic =

- Municipality
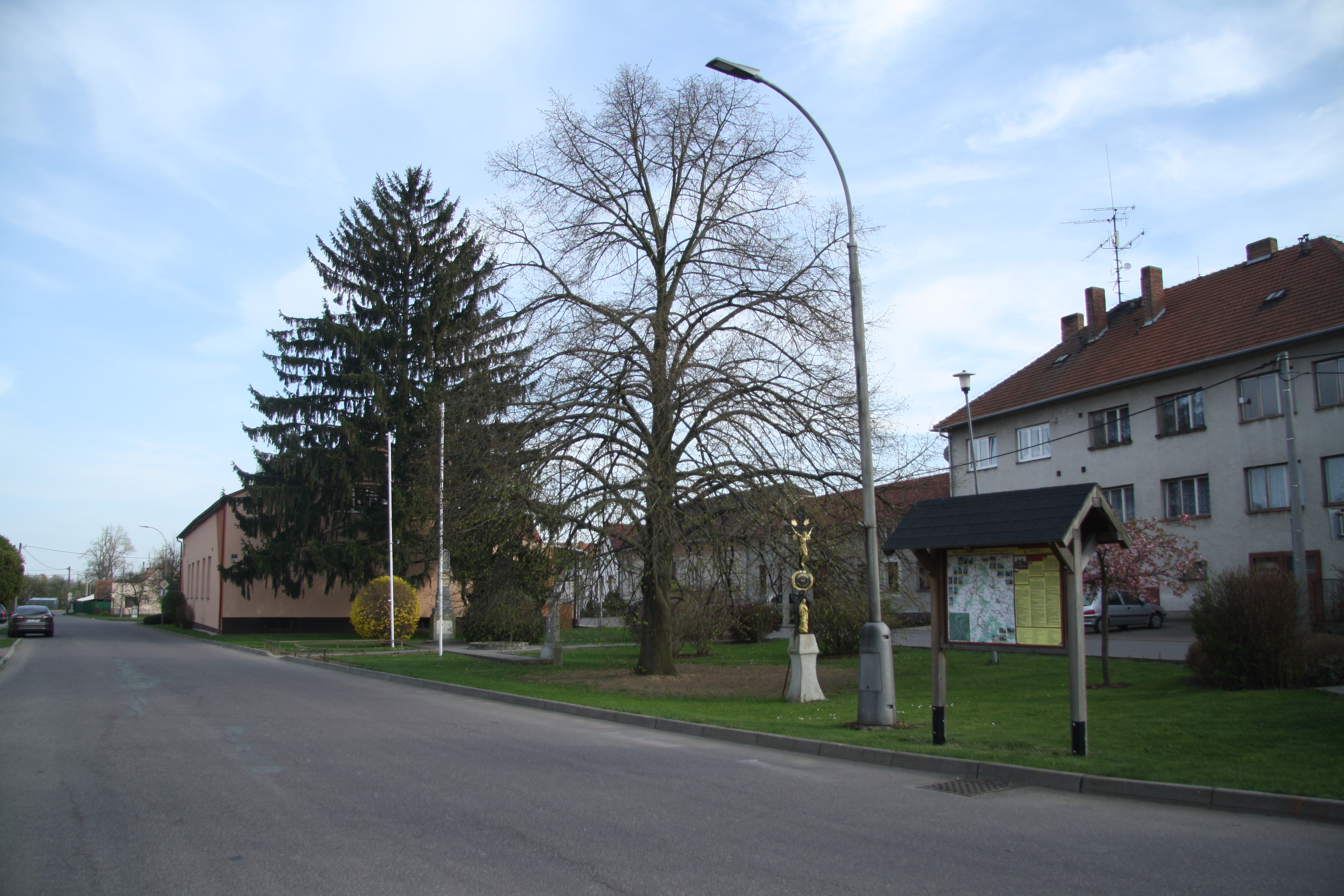
- Centre of Jakubov u Moravských Budějovic

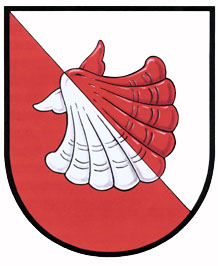
- Flag Coat of arms

- Location in the Czech Republic
- Coordinates: 49°4′52″N 15°45′41″E
- Country: Czech Republic
- Region: Vysočina
- District: Třebíč
- First mentioned: 1230

Area
  - Total: 9.88 km^{2} (3.81 sq mi)
- Elevation: 473 m (1,552 ft)

Population (2026-01-01)
  - Total: 698
  - Density: 70.6/km^{2} (183/sq mi)
- Time zone: UTC+1 (CET)
  - Summer (DST): UTC+2 (CEST)
- Postal code: 675 44
- Website: www.jakubov.cz

Jakubov u Moravských Budějovic is a municipality and village in Třebíč District in the Vysočina Region of the Czech Republic. It has about 700 inhabitants.

Jakubov u Moravských Budějovic lies approximately 18 kilometres (11 mi) south-west of Třebíč, 37 km (23 mi) south of Jihlava, and 147 km (91 mi) south-east of Prague.

== Demographics ==
Historical population
Year	Pop.	±%
1869	570	—
1880	563	−1.2%
1890	536	−4.8%
1900	526	−1.9%
1910	539	+2.5%
1921	524	−2.8%
1930	543	+3.6%
1950	477	−12.2%
1961	526	+10.3%
1970	516	−1.9%
1980	511	−1.0%
1991	555	+8.6%
2001	572	+3.1%
2011	587	+2.6%
2021	626	+6.6%
Source: Censuses
