= Lesní Jakubov =

- Municipality
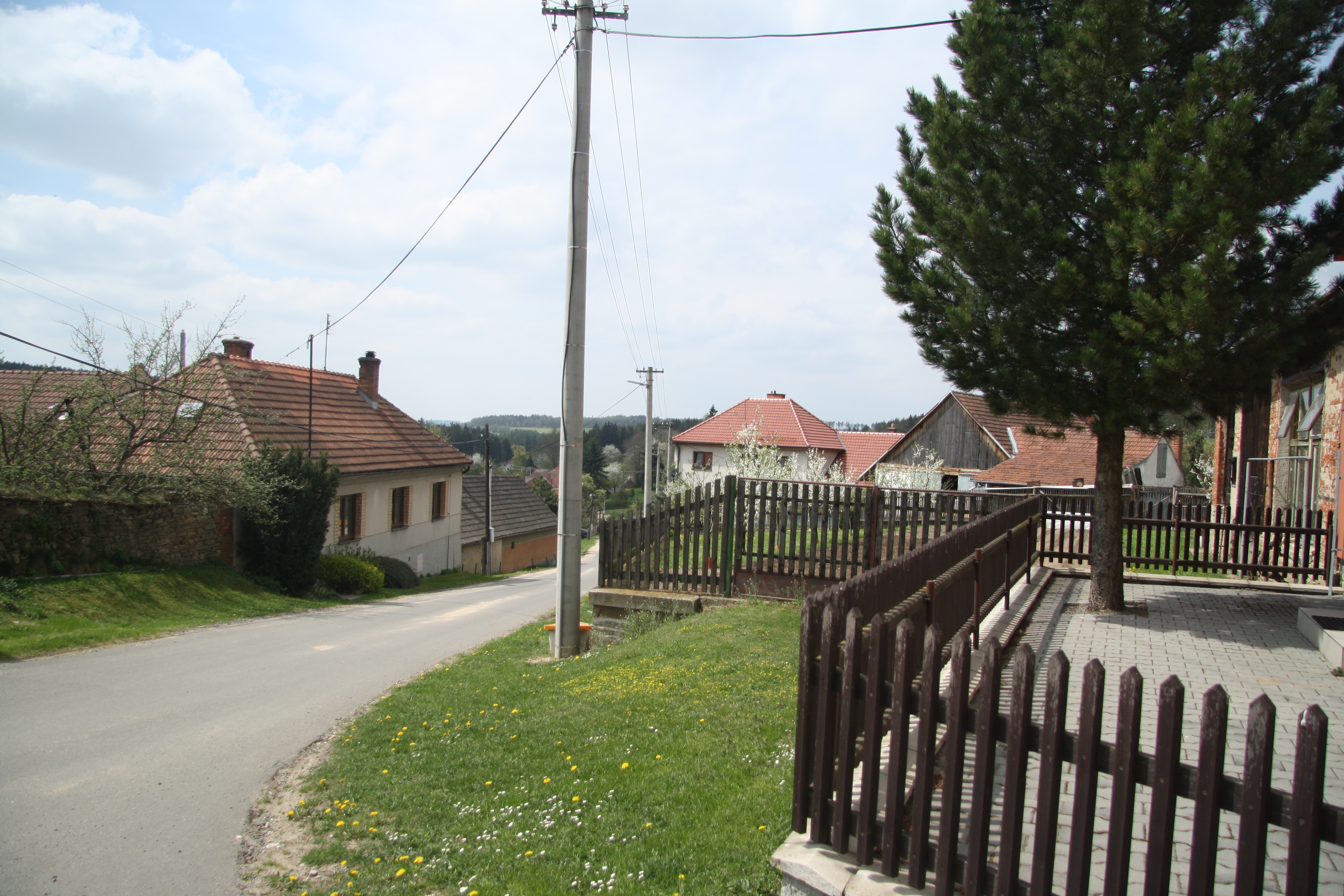
- Centre of Lesní Jakubov

- Flag Coat of arms

- Location in the Czech Republic
- Coordinates: 49°12′21″N 16°14′36″E
- Country: Czech Republic
- Region: Vysočina
- District: Třebíč
- First mentioned: 1356

Area
  - Total: 3.19 km^{2} (1.23 sq mi)
- Elevation: 444 m (1,457 ft)

Population (2026-01-01)
  - Total: 117
  - Density: 36.7/km^{2} (95.0/sq mi)
- Time zone: UTC+1 (CET)
  - Summer (DST): UTC+2 (CEST)
- Postal code: 675 73
- Website: www.lesnijakubov.cz

Lesní Jakubov is a municipality and village in Třebíč District in the Vysočina Region of the Czech Republic. It has about 100 inhabitants.

Lesní Jakubov lies approximately 27 kilometres (17 mi) east of Třebíč, 53 km (33 mi) south-east of Jihlava, and 164 km (102 mi) south-east of Prague.

== Demographics ==
Historical population
Year	Pop.	±%
1869	172	—
1880	168	−2.3%
1890	178	+6.0%
1900	170	−4.5%
1910	157	−7.6%
1921	156	−0.6%
1930	158	+1.3%
1950	149	−5.7%
1961	159	+6.7%
1970	134	−15.7%
1980	114	−14.9%
1991	110	−3.5%
2001	95	−13.6%
2011	388	+308.4%
2021	797	+105.4%
Source: Censuses

== Economy ==
The Rapotice Prison is the main employer in Lesní Jakubov. It is classified as a low-, medium- and high-security prison for men with a capacity of 755 prisoners. It employs more than 200 people.
