= Termez Airport =

Airport in Uzbekistan

Coordinates: 37°17′12″N 067°18′36″E

Termez International Airport Termiz xalqaro aeroporti
- IATA: TMJ; ICAO: UZST

Summary
- Airport type: Public
- Owner: Government of Uzbekistan
- Operator: Uzbekistan Airways
- Serves: Termez
- Location: Termez, Uzbekistan
- Elevation AMSL: 1,027 ft (313 m)
- Website: http://termezairport.uz

Map
- Location of air base in Uzbekistan

Runways
Direction	Length		Surface
Direction	m	ft	Surface
07/25	3,000	9,843	Concrete
- Source: DAFIF

Termez International Airport (IATA: TMJ, ICAO: UZST) is an airport serving Termez, a city in southern Uzbekistan. It was used as a base for German Air Force C-160 "Transalls" which were part of the German ISAF-contingent.

== Airlines and destinations ==
Airlines	Destinations
azimuth	Sochi
Flykhiva	Istanbul
Pegasus Airlines	Istanbul-Sabiha Gökçen (begins 1 March 2027)
Pobeda	Moscow–Vnukovo
Qanot Sharq	Saint Petersburg
Silk Avia	Tashkent
Uzbekistan Airways	Moscow–Vnukovo, Saint Petersburg, Tashkent

== See also ==
- List of the busiest airports in the former USSR
- Transportation in Uzbekistan
