= Birkir Hólm Guðnason =

CEO of Icelandair

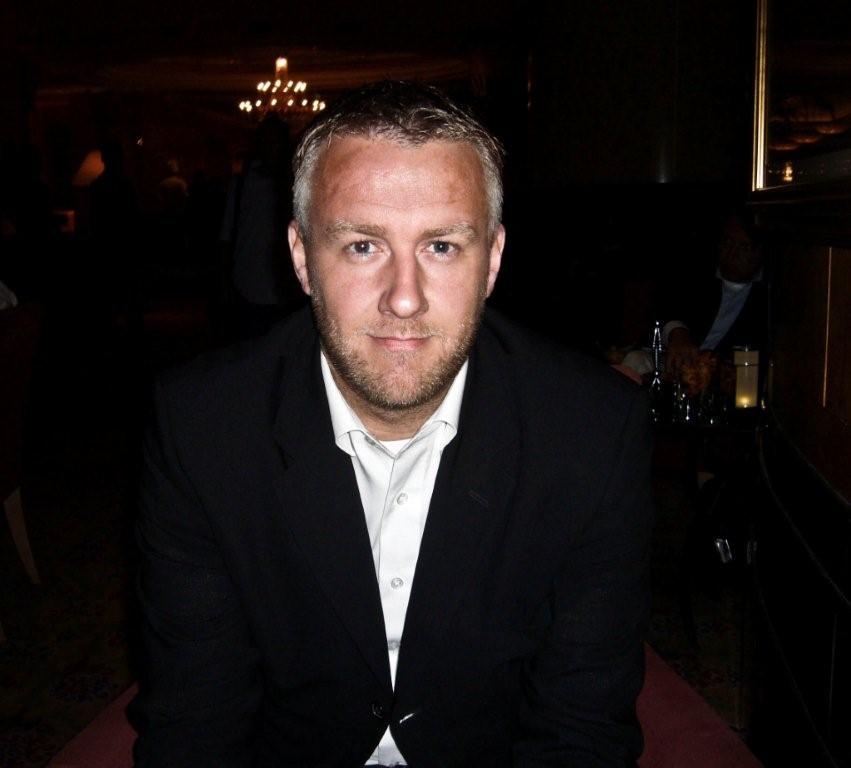
Birkir Hólm Guðnason

Birkir Hólm Guðnason (born 6 May 1974, Akureyri, Iceland) was the CEO of Icelandair, the flag carrier airline in Iceland, from 2008 to 2017.

== Life and career ==
Birkir (see Icelandic name customs) is from Akureyri in northern Iceland. He finished a bachelor of science degree in Economics and Business Administration in 1998 from Aalborg University, Denmark. Two years later he finished his MBA in International Business and Economics from the same university.

Birkir worked for Icelandair since graduating. He started as Sales Manager in Iceland, then had the same job for North America. He moved back to Europe when he became General Manager for Central Europe, stationed in Frankfurt. In 2006, he became General Manager for Scandinavia, stationed in Copenhagen.

In May 2008, Birkir was appointed CEO of Icelandair.

He presided over the company in turbulent times, first with the Icelandic economic collapse in late 2008 and then the volcanic eruptions in 2010 and 2011.

In September 2018, Birkir became CEO of Samskip Iceland.
