= Dmitry Yakubovskiy =

Businessman

- Дмитрий Якубовский
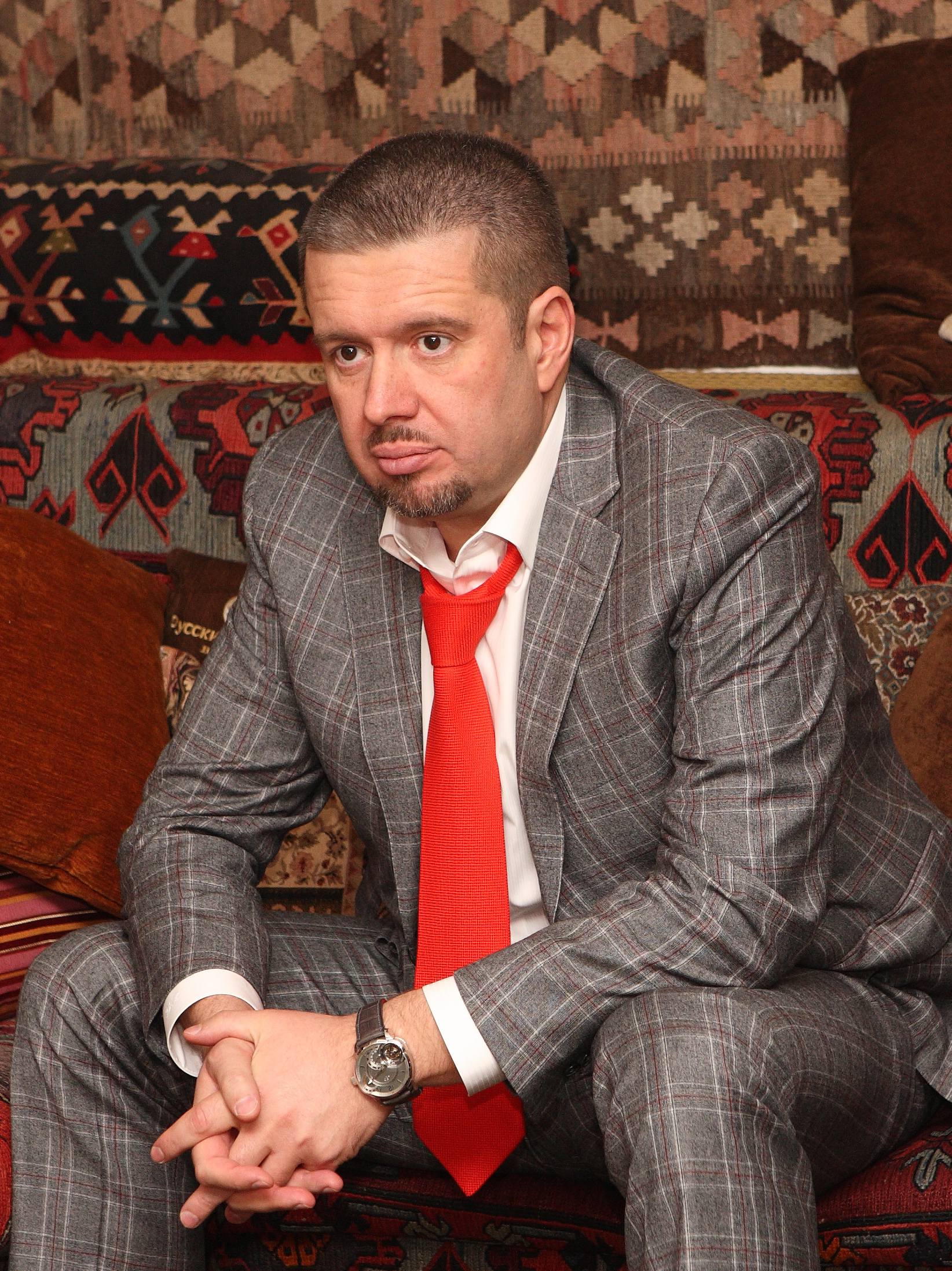

Personal details
- Born: Dmitry Olegovich Yakubovskiy; September 5, 1963 (age 62) Bolshevo, Korolev, Moscow Oblast, RSFSR, USSR
- Citizenship: USSR, Russia, Bulgaria
- Education: Kutafin Moscow State Law University RANEPA; Finance University under the Government of the Russian Federation Saratov Orthodox Theological Seminary
- Occupation: Lawyer, advocate, entrepreneur, university lecturer
- Academic degree: Doctor of Science in Jurisprudence
- Academic rank: professor

Dmitry Olegovich Yakubovskiy (Russian: Дмитрий Олегович Якубовский, IPA: [ˈdmʲitrʲɪj ɐˈlʲeɡəvʲɪtɕ jɪkʊˈbofskʲɪj]; born September 5, 1963) is a Soviet and Russian lawyer, advocate and businessman. Yakubovskiy defended a number of famous people in high-profile cases and held important government positions. He was nicknamed "General Dima" by the Russian press for his swift rise to the highest ranks in Russian military. According to Bilanz Magazine, while living in Switzerland in 2009–2016, he was within the 200 richest people of Switzerland, with his private property amounting to CHF 700–800 million.

Since 2016 Yakubovskiy has been living in Russia.

== Biography ==
=== Early life ===
Dmitry Yakubovskiy was born in the military townlet Bolshevo near Moscow, Russia, on September 5, 1963. He is the eldest of three brothers. Yakubovskiy grew up in Bolshevo, where he graduated from high school in 1980. His father, Oleg Yakubovskiy, engineer, held the rank of Lieutenant Colonel, served under the Strategic Missile Command, and died in 1980 at the age of 42 due to medical malpractice.

=== Personal life ===
Yakubovskiy has been married 13 times. He is currently divorced, but remains on friendly terms with all his ex-wives.

=== Career ===
==== 1980 – 1991 ====
After having graduated from high school in 1980, Yakubovskiy successfully passed entrance exams to A.F. Mozhaysky's Military Engineering Institute in Leningrad, but denied admission by the Credentials Committee (committee responsible for security clearance). He then enrolled in Perm Senior Service College, and after a year, was expelled and conscripted to active duty as a private in the Soviet Army.

Upon completion of his military service, he held various positions in the Office of the Procurator General of the USSR, Gossnab (State Supplies) of the USSR, the Glavmosremont (state monopolist in the field of capital repair and reconstruction of residential buildings) of the Moscow City Executive Committee, Moscow City Bar Council, as the head of a directorate of the Moscow City Procurator's Office, and as the board secretary of the USSR Union of Lawyers. He joined the CPSU in 1989.

In 1990, he was appointed the leader of a working group of the Ministry of Defense of the USSR in the Western Group of Forces, Germany. He was soon discharged from that position following a complaint from the Germans of overzealous efforts to register to the Soviet Union, real estate vacated by the Russian Military in Germany. Following his discharge, Yakobovskiy was sent to Basel, Switzerland as the representative of Agrokhim (the former USSR Ministry of Mineral Fertilizers). After the 1991 Soviet coup d'état attempt, he moved to Canada.

==== 1992 – 1994 ====
Colonel, Deputy Head of the Chief Signal Intelligence Directorate of the Federal Agency for Government Communications and Information under the President of Russia. Moscow, 1992.

In March 1992, he returned to Russia. At the age of 28, he was an advisor at the Government of Russia, an advisor of the Prosecutor General of Russia for international legal matters, a consultant at the Criminal Militia Service of the MIA of Russia, and a Deputy Head of the Chief Signal Intelligence Directorate in the Federal Agency for Government Communications and Information (the former 16th Directorate of the KGB). In the process of his appointment to the position of the Plenipotentiary Representative of the Law Enforcement Authorities and Special and Information Services in the Government of Russia, a conflict developed between Yakubovskiy and Alexander Korzhakov, the head of the Presidential Security Service (Russia), and Mikhail Barsukov, the future head of FSB RF, with led to removing Yakubovskiy from all his offices.

In 1993, during the "Sleaze" War and at the time of the second coup, Yakubovskiy actively took part alongside the Russian president, Boris Yeltsin, in the conflict between the president and the Supreme Soviet.

==== 1994 – 1998 ====
Prisoner in Establishment UShch-349/13. Nizhny Tagil, 1998.

In December 1994, Yakubovskiy was arrested and accused of stealing books from the National Library of Russia in Saint Petersburg, and while being incarcerated in Kresty Prison, accused of "beating" a cellmate (an athlete, Candidate for Master of Sports of USSR). Yakubovskiy was sentenced to 4 years in minimum-security penal colony. He served his sentence in Nizhny Tagil, Sverdlovsk Oblast, in a special colony for former law enforcement officials. Yakubovskiy was released in December 1998. In 2001, all convictions were pardoned.

==== 1998–2007 ====
While working as a lawyer, Yakubovskiy was involved in a number of high-profile cases, including the defense of Lyudmila B. Narusova, the widow of the ex-mayor of Saint Petersburg, Arnold A. Spuvakovsky, an established businessman from the Solntsevo District, and the representation of several minority shareholders in their dispute with Alfa Bank JSC. Yakubovskiy hosted the "Arrest and Freedom" show at Ren TV. Yakubovskiy earned a PhD in jurisprudence, worked as a Professor in the Department of Practice of Law and Human Rights of A.S. Griboedov Institute of International Law and Economics in Moscow and was the Chairman of the Presidium of the First Metropolitan Bar College. In 2003, Yakubovskiy funded the construction of the church and clergy house of the Trinity Lavra of St. Sergius in the settlement of Gorki-8 of Odintsovsky District in Moscow Oblast – The Church of the Beheading of Saint John the Baptist.

==== 2007–present ====
In 2007, Yakubovskiy transitioned to a business career and partnered with "Sistema Hals", a subsidiary of AFK Sistema PAO headed by Vladimir Yevtushenkov. Since 2009, he is a partner of VTB, initially, in "Gorki-8" and after, in the "City Land Group Company", with equity capital of over RUB 140 billion. In April 2015, Yakubovskiy sold his share in "City Land Group Company" to the VTB Group for the price of RUB 15.1 billion and fully immersed himself in bringing the low-temperature thermodiffusion coating technology of the Swiss company Thermission to Russia. Yakubovskiy founded the joint venture of "KamAZ-Thermission" in cooperation with JSC KamAZ and introduced this technology into the manufacturing processes of Uralvagonzavod, Russian Railways, and others. According to the estimates of PricewaterhouseCoopers (PwC), as of March 31, 2016, the market value (by IFRS) of the Russian part of that business amounted to over RUB 50 billion, and its investment value exceeded RUB 100 billion.

Thermission AG plant in Thun, Canton Bern, Switzerland, 2015

As a result of corporate battles around the primary business assets of Yakubovskiy in Russia, thedecision of the Arbitration Court of Moscow Oblast, dated December 15, 2017, set in motion Yakubovskiy's personal debt restructuring process. The creditors claimed under RUB 10 billion in total, which amounted to 20% of the market value of the assets. Yakubovskiy was adjudged insolvent (bankrupt) by the decision of the Arbitration Court of Moscow Oblast, dated September 9, 2019, and became subject to personal bankruptcy proceedings through the sale of his property. The proceedings were delayed due to the complex structure of the property.

== General references ==
Yakubovskiy, D.O., Yakubovskaya, I.P. What Is Arrest and How to Fight It: A Practical Guide. — M.: Politburo; Vagrius, 1999. — 576 p. — 11,000 copies. — ISBN 5-89756-016-1. (In Russian).

Yakubovskaya, I.P. General Dima. Career. Prison. Love. — M.: Sovershenno sekretno, 1999. — 280 p. — ISBN 5-89048-049-9. (In Russian).

Topol, E., Grant, A. Prisoner to Kremlin. (In Russian).

Yakubovskaya, I.P., Padva, G.P. Case of Dmitry Yakubovskiy. A Documentary Report. — M.: Sovershenno sekretno, 1999. — 576 p. — ISBN 5-89048-069-3. (In Russian).
