= Jakubowo =

Jakubowo may refer to the following places:

- Jakubowo, Kuyavian-Pomeranian Voivodeship (north-central Poland)
- Jakubowo, Sępólno County in Kuyavian-Pomeranian Voivodeship (north-central Poland)
- Jakubowo, Podlaskie Voivodeship (north-east Poland)
- Jakubowo, Szamotuły County in Greater Poland Voivodeship (west-central Poland)
- Jakubowo, Wągrowiec County in Greater Poland Voivodeship (west-central Poland)
- Jakubowo, Chojnice County in Pomeranian Voivodeship (north Poland)
- Jakubowo, Kwidzyn County in Pomeranian Voivodeship (north Poland)
- Jakubowo, Mrągowo County in Warmian-Masurian Voivodeship (north Poland)
- Jakubowo, Ostróda County in Warmian-Masurian Voivodeship (north Poland)
