= Ikrom Yakubov =

- Born: Moscow, Russian SFRS, USSR (now Russia)
- Known for: claimed to have defected from Uzbekistan's security service, where he witnessed torture

Ikrom Yakubov alleges that he is a former intelligence officer of Uzbekistan, in its National Security Service (SNB), who suggests that he defected to the United Kingdom in 2008. He is notable because, after his defection, he confirmed earlier reports that Uzbekistan routinely tortured captives. In 2008, he also alleged that the crash of Uzbekistan Airways Flight 1154 had been engineered by the Uzbek leadership, killing UN Resident Representative Richard Conroy.

== Early life ==
Yakubov described wanting to become an intelligence officer when he was a child because he wanted to follow the example of his father and grandfather, who were senior KGB officers in the old Soviet Union.

== Life in the United Kingdom ==
Radio Free Europe reported, in 2011, that Yakubov was convicted of illegally using a phony Portuguese passport.

Radio Free Europe reported that a leading Uzbek human rights worker, Surat Ikramov, challenged Yakubov's account of himself. They reported Ikramov claimed that while Yakubov had worked for the Uzbek government, it was a low-level job, and not as a security official, and he learned no secrets there. Ikramov claimed Yakubov had worked for him, as a translator. He claimed Yakubov had requested permission to extend a trip to the UK, only to then claim political asylum, and then cut his ties to Ikramov and his organization.

In 2017 Yakubov submitted a PhD thesis to the University of Dundee, entitled "The Role of Intelligence in Securitisation Processes: A Tool or An Agent."
