= Jakubów =

Jakubów may refer to the following places in Poland:

- Jakubów, Polkowice County in Lower Silesian Voivodeship (south-west Poland)
- Jakubów, Świdnica County in Lower Silesian Voivodeship (south-west Poland)
- Jakubów, Ząbkowice County in Lower Silesian Voivodeship (south-west Poland)
- Jakubów, Rawa County in Łódź Voivodeship (central Poland)
- Jakubów, Skierniewice County in Łódź Voivodeship (central Poland)
- Jakubów, Jędrzejów County in Świętokrzyskie Voivodeship (south-central Poland)
- Jakubów, Włoszczowa County in Świętokrzyskie Voivodeship (south-central Poland)
- Jakubów, Białobrzegi County in Masovian Voivodeship (east-central Poland)
- Jakubów, Grójec County in Masovian Voivodeship (east-central Poland)
- Jakubów, Gmina Goszczyn in Masovian Voivodeship (east-central Poland)
- Jakubów, Mińsk County in Masovian Voivodeship (east-central Poland)
- Jakubów, Przysucha County in Masovian Voivodeship (east-central Poland)

== See also ==
- Jakubov (disambiguation)
