= 1951 Glitfaxi plane crash =

Deadly plane crash in Iceland

1951 Flugfélag Íslands DC-3 crash
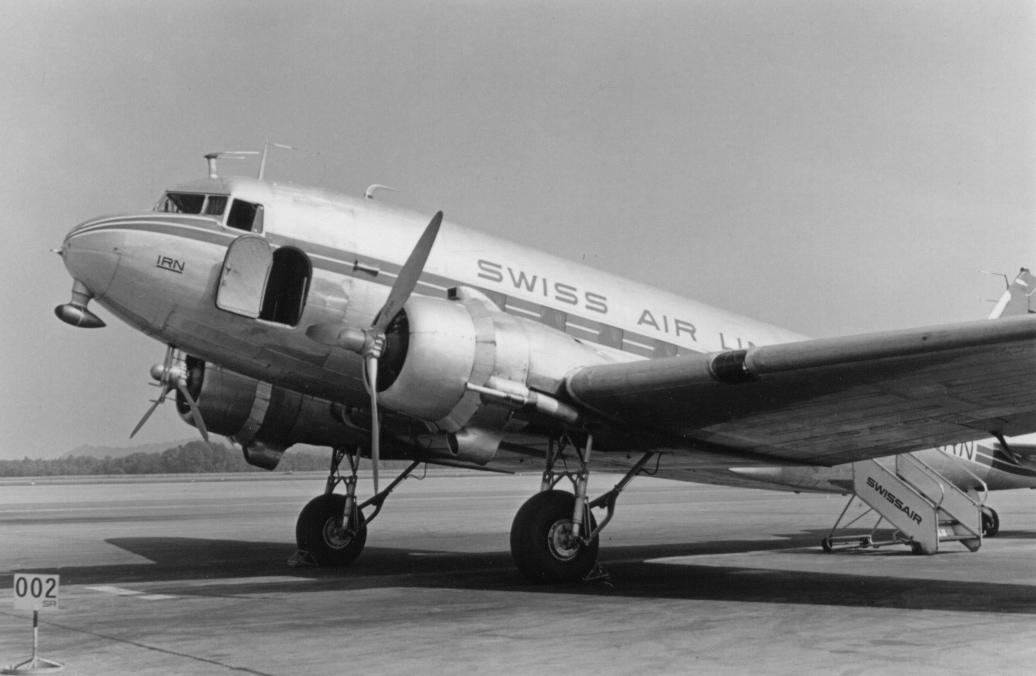
- A Douglas DC-3, similar to the aircraft involved

Accident
- Date: 31 January 1951
- Summary: Crashed into water, cause undetermined
- Site: Faxaflói, Iceland

Aircraft
- Aircraft type: Douglas DC-3
- Aircraft name: Glitfaxi
- Operator: Flugfélag Íslands
- Registration: TF-ISG
- Flight origin: Vestmannaeyjar
- Destination: Reykjavík
- Passengers: 17
- Crew: 3
- Fatalities: 20
- Survivors: 0

The 1951 Flugfélag Íslands DC-3 crash (Icelandic: Glitfaxaslysið, "the Glitfaxi accident") was a plane crash that occurred on 31 January 1951 when a Douglas DC-3 from Flugfélag Íslands, christened Glitfaxi, crashed in Faxaflói in Iceland, killing all 20 people aboard. It remains the second deadliest air crash in Iceland behind the 1947 Héðinsfjörður air crash.

The plane was attempting to land at Reykjavík airport during heavy snowfall. Its first attempt to land was aborted due to low visibility. During its second attempt, all contact was lost with the plane. After it became clear that Glitfaxi had disappeared, a search immediately began. The following days, both land, sea and air searches were conducted including by the ICGV Ægir and the herring vessel Fanney that searched the area with depth sounders. While several items belonging to the plane were found in the ocean, the wreck itself was never officially found.

== Aircraft ==
Glitfaxi was built in 1942 in Santa Monica, California, for the United States Air Force. In November 1946, Flugfélag Íslands bought the aircraft from Scottish Aviation which had converted her for passenger flights.

== Aftermath ==
The crash hit the small town of Vestmannaeyjar hard, where the majority of the passengers where from, leaving 50 children in the town without a father.

== In popular culture ==
The accident is featured in the book Hinn hvíti galdur by Ólafur Tryggvason.
