= Flight 704 =

Flight 704 may refer to:

- Mexicana Flight 704, crashed on 4 June 1969
- Icelandair Flugfélag Islands Flight 704, crashed on 26 September 1970
