= Ísafjörður Airport =

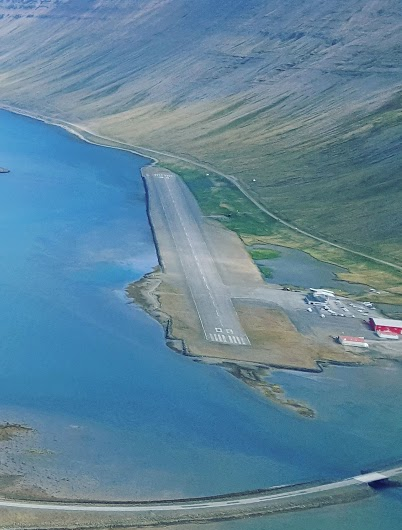
- IATA: IFJ; ICAO: BIIS

Summary
- Airport type: Public
- Operator: Isavia
- Serves: Ísafjörður, Iceland
- Opened: 2 October 1960
- Elevation AMSL: 8 ft (2.4 m)
- Coordinates: 66°03′29″N 23°08′07″W

Map
- Location of Airport in Iceland

Runways
Direction	Length		Surface
Direction	m	ft	Surface
07/25	1,400	4,593	Asphalt

Statistics (2016)
- Passengers: 33,076
- Source: DAFIF GCM

Ísafjörður Airport (Icelandic: Ísafjarðarflugvöllur [ˈiːsaˌfjarðarˌflʏɣˌvœtlʏr̥]; IATA: IFJ, ICAO: BIIS) is an airport serving Ísafjörður, a town in the Westfjords (Icelandic: Vestfirðir) region in northwestern Iceland.

== History ==
Planning for the airport started in 1958 construction of the runway started the same year. It was originally 1,100 meters long and the cost of the construction was 4.8 million ISK. It was formally opened on 2 October 1960 with Gljáfaxi, a Douglas DC-3 from Flugfélag Íslands, being the first plane to land on the airport.

In 2025, Icelandair announced that it would potentially close their route to Ísafjörður Airport on a commercial basis. Their fleet of Bombardier Dash 8-200 aircraft were now unsustainable after new airports in Greenland (Nuuk and Ilulissat) were constructed, which support larger aircraft. Maintaining a fleet of smaller Dash 8-200 aircraft only for Ísafjörður flights would not be viable. However, in April 2026, the Icelandic Government came to an agreement with Icelandair to subsidise and continue flights to Ísafjörður until at least 2030.

== Approach ==
Located in a fjord, the approach to the runway requires aircraft to fly close to the surrounding terrain, making it unique and more challenging than most airports. Approaches generally cannot be straight-in for either direction, and when landing to the northeast, a full 180 degree turn must be made before touchdown. The sharp turn and the approach is featured as one of the landing challenges in Microsoft Flight Simulator 2020.

== Airlines and destinations ==
Airlines	Destinations
Icelandair	Reykjavík

== Statistics ==
=== Passengers and movements ===
	Number of passengers (Note: Number of passengers including domestic, international and transit.)	Number of movements (Note: Number of movements represents total takeoffs and landings during that year.)
2003	40,060	2,154
2004	45,395	2,496
2005	45,682	2,514
2006	44,604	2,144
2007	50,314	2,638
2008	51,791	2,468
2009	46,905	2,046
2010	43,204	2,092
2011	42,262	1,908
2012	40,331	2,010
2013	35,577	2,028
2014	34,946	1,874
2015	33,343	1,796
2016	33,076	2,006
2017	34,551	1,779
2018	32,552	2,061
2019	32,332	2,187
2020	14,710	1,271
2021	26,069	1,717

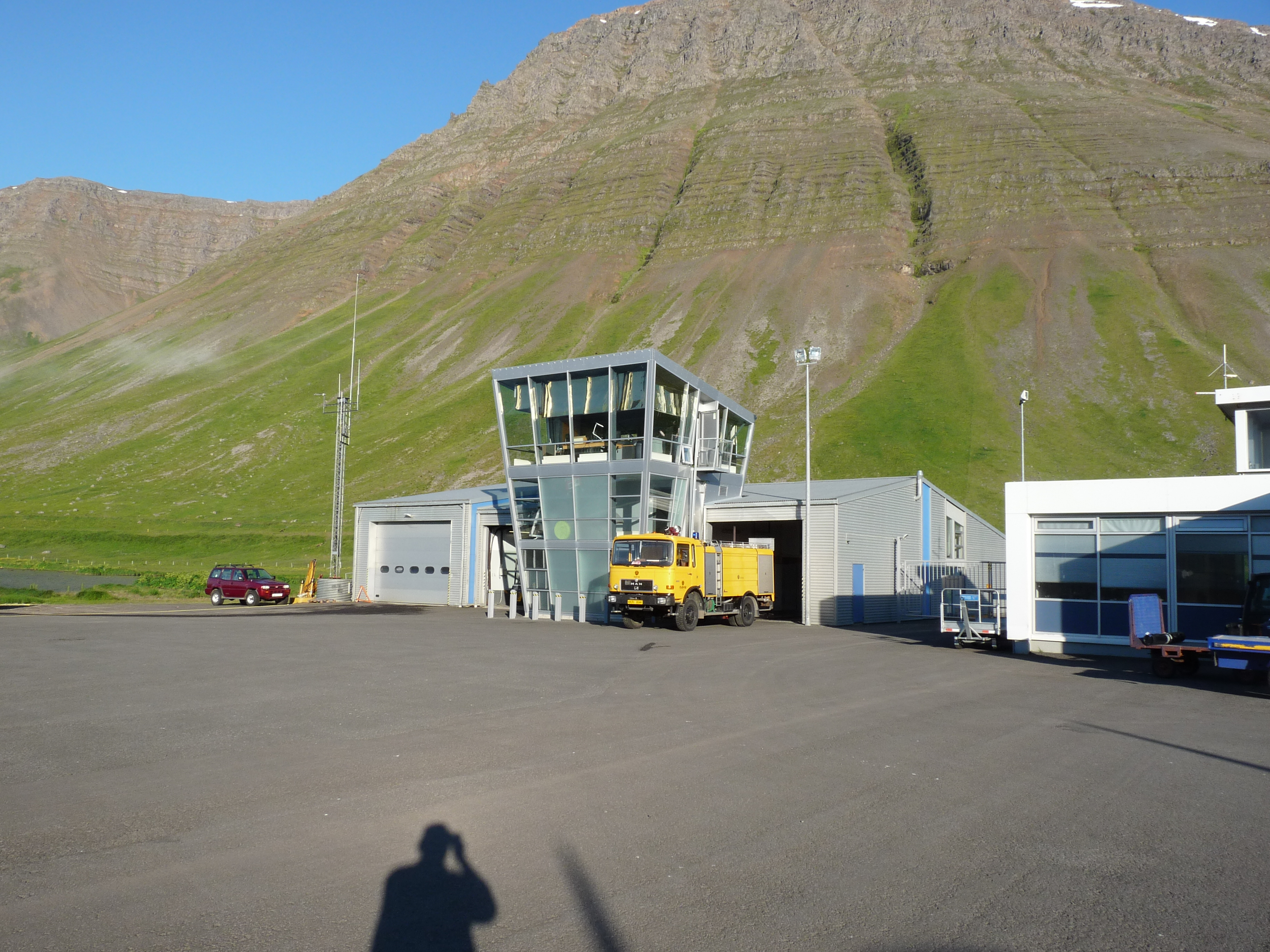
Control tower.

== Incidents ==
On 20 March 1982, the left engine of Flugleiðir's Fokker F27 Friendship, with registration TL-FLM, blew up during takeoff from Ísafjörður Airport, at the altitude of 490 feet. The pilots managed to put out the fire but could not lower the left landing gear due to the damage it sustained in the explosion. Instead of trying to land on the narrow Ísafjörður airport with only two wheels down, the captain decided to fly about 230 km to the much larger Keflavík Airport to attempt an emergency landing there. Despite the front part of the engine almost breaking off in the explosion, the plane managed to land in Keflavík with minimal additional damage to the plane. All 25 people on board survived without injuries.

== See also ==
- Transport in Iceland
- List of airports in Iceland
