= Smárason =

Smárason may refer to:

- Arnór Smárason (born 1988), Icelandic footballer
- Hannes Smárason (born 1967), Icelandic businessman and former CEO of FL Group
- Örvar Þóreyjarson Smárason (born 1977), poet/author and founding member of Icelandic experimental band múm
