= Sigurdur Helgason (airline executive) =

Icelandic airline executive (1921–2009)

Sigurður Helgason (July 20, 1921 – February 8, 2009) was an Icelandic airline executive best known for pioneering low-cost transatlantic airfares through his leadership at Loftleiðir, later known as Icelandair.

== Biography ==
Helgason was born on July 20, 1921, in Reykjavík, the capital of Iceland. In his 20s, he moved to the United States and graduated with a business degree from Columbia University in New York City in 1947. Upon returning to Iceland, he managed a cement company.

In 1953, Helgason joined the board of Loftleiðir, a small Icelandic airline established by three pilots in 1944. At that time, the International Air Transport Association (IATA) regulated its members' fares. As a non-member, Loftleiðir, or Icelandic Airlines in English, was able to significantly undercut other transatlantic carriers' pricing, and it began service from New York to Luxembourg in 1955.

Helgason managed the American operations of the company from 1961 to 1973. At that point, Loftleiðir was merged with Flugfélag Íslands to form Icelandair and he returned to Reykjavik to become its CEO. He stepped down as chief executive in 1984, assuming the position of chairman until retirement in 1991. He then lived in Iceland, Mustique, and New York City.

Helgason's main interests after retirement were fly fishing and the International House of New York. He leased many rivers across Iceland, including the Hofsa. As a member of the International House of New York, he served on the board of directors, where he won the Harry Edmonds Award.

Helgason died at the age of 87 on the island of Mustique in Saint Vincent and the Grenadines, where he spent winters. He was the first and currently only non-native to be buried on the island.
