= Hornafjörður Airport =

- IATA: HFN; ICAO: BIHN

Summary
- Airport type: Public
- Operator: Isavia
- Location: Höfn, Iceland
- Elevation AMSL: 24 ft (7.3 m)
- Coordinates: 64°17′44″N 15°13′38″W

Map
- Location of Airport in Iceland

Runways
Direction	Length		Surface
Direction	m	ft	Surface
18/36	1,500	4,921	Asphalt

Statistics (2016)
- Passengers: 11,183
- Source: DAFIF GCM

Hornafjörður Airport or Hornafjordur Airport (IATA: HFN, ICAO: BIHN) is an airport serving Höfn, Iceland. The airport is 5 kilometres (3.1 mi) north of the town. It is served by Icelandair with regular flights to Reykjavík Airport.

The Hornafjordur non-directional beacon (Ident: HN) is located 1.24 nautical miles off the threshold of runway 36.

== History ==
The airport was opened on 22 September 1965, replacing a landing area on coastal spit south of the town at Melatangi, Suðurfjörður. The airport originally opened with a second 800 m runway which ran east-west, later decommissioned. A larger terminal building was added in 1982.

Icelandair had served the airport since its inception until Eagle Air took over service to the airport from 2007-2024. Icelandair began serving the airport again by way of a public service contract in 2025.

In the 2013 film The Secret Life of Walter Mitty, Hornafjörður Airport is depicted as Nuuk Airport, with an Air Greenland aircraft landing there.

== Airlines and destinations ==
Airlines	Destinations
Icelandair	Reykjavík

== Statistics ==
=== Passengers and movements ===
	Number of passengers (Note: Number of passengers including domestic, international and transit.)	Number of movements (Note: Number of movements represents total takeoffs and landings during that year.)
2003	8,414	1,366
2004	8.973	1,594
2005	8,864	1,602
2006	8,873	1,328
2007	9,512	1,300
2008	10,677	1,276
2009	10,572	1,381
2010	9,888	1,350
2011	10,645	1,184
2012	9,271	1,100
2013	9,263	1,100
2014	9,887	1,086
2015	9,440	1,150
2016	11,183	1,216
2017	11,008	1,424
2018	11,342	1,361
2019	10,005	1,219
2020	5,876	837
2021	8,586	1,097

== See also ==
- Transport in Iceland
- List of airports in Iceland
