= FaroeJet =

Airline of the Faroe Islands

Faroejet
IATA	ICAO	Call sign
F6	RCK	ROCKROSE
- Founded: December 2005
- Ceased operations: December 16, 2006
- Hubs: Vágar Airport
- Fleet size: 1
- Destinations: 2
- Headquarters: Vágar, Faroe Islands
- Key people: Jóhan E. Simonsen; Óli í Búrstovu

FaroeJet was an airline based in Vágar Airport on the island of Vágar of Faroe Islands. It was the second airline of the islands, the other one being Atlantic Airways. The airline ceased all operations on December 16, 2006, because of financial problems.

== History ==
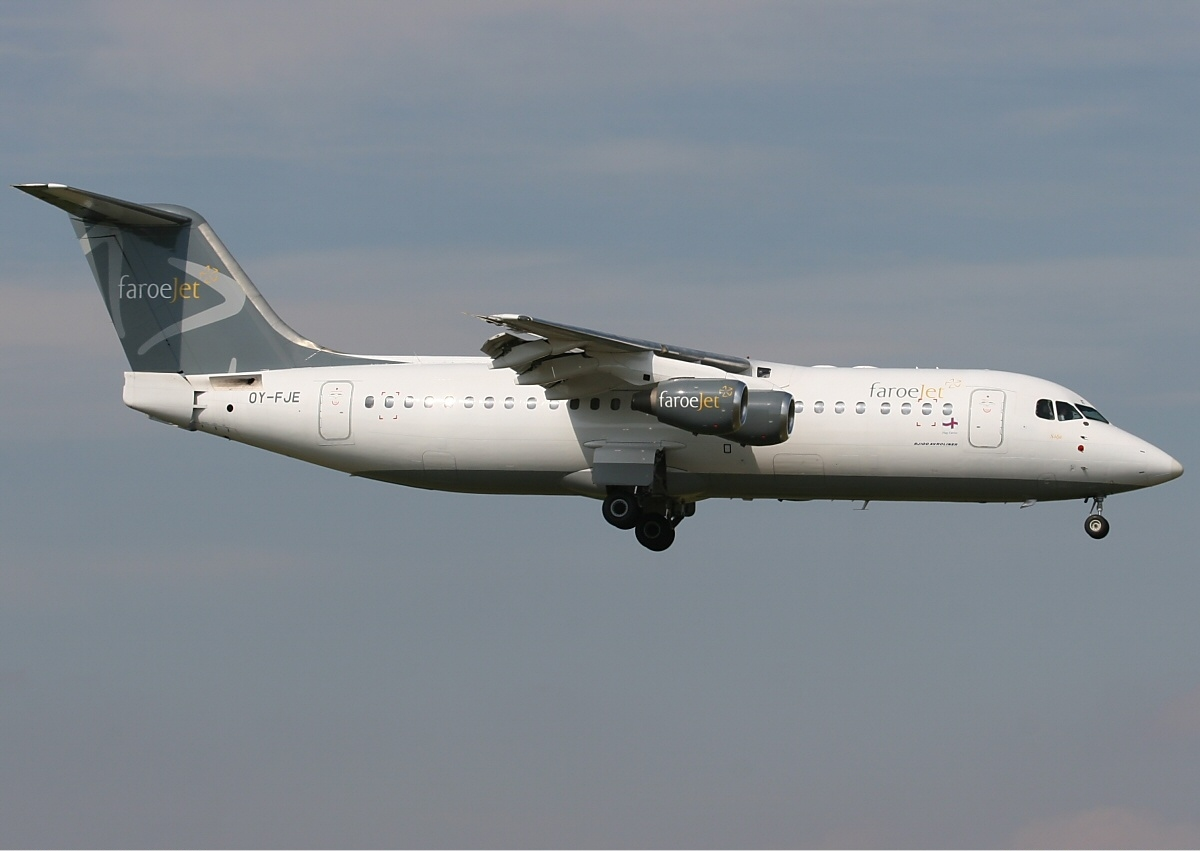
Avro RJ100 FaroeJet's only aircraft

It was founded by private companies and investors in December 2005. The first flight was carried out on May 15, 2006, with a Avro RJ100 leased from BAE Systems, flying the route between Copenhagen and Vagar. However, in December 2006, due to the unfavorable results the airline declared bankruptcy and ceased business on January 1, 2007.

== Services ==
The airline had one 96-seat Avro RJ100 in one-class configuration which served the route Copenhagen, Denmark - Faroe Islands once daily, except for Saturdays.

== Fleet ==
As of August 2006, the FaroeJet fleet consisted of:

- 1 Avro RJ100
