= Flugfélag Íslands Flight 704 =

1970 aviation accident

Coordinates: 62.105070°N 7.589285°W

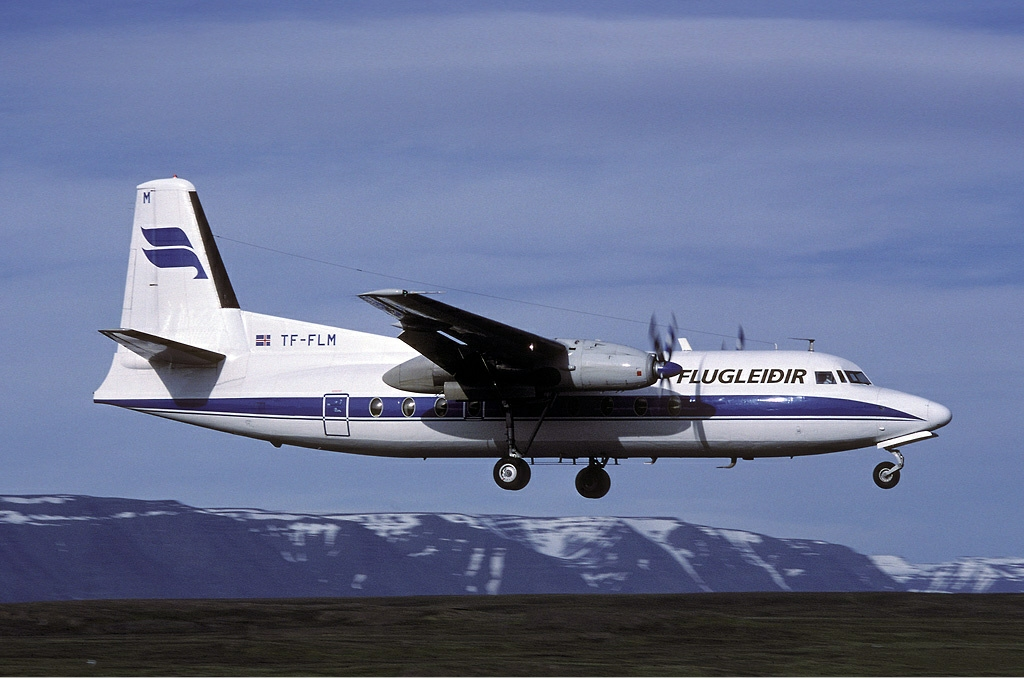
- A Fokker F-27, similar to the one involved in the accident

Accident
- Date: 26 September 1970
- Summary: Controlled flight into terrain
- Site: Mykines, Faroe Islands, Denmark

Aircraft
- Aircraft type: Fokker F27 Friendship
- Operator: Flugfélag Íslands
- IATA flight No.: NY704
- ICAO flight No.: FXI704
- Call sign: FAXI 704
- Registration: TF-FIL
- Flight origin: Reykjavík Airport, Iceland
- 1st stopover: Bergen, Norway
- Destination: Vágar Airport, Faroe Islands, Denmark
- Occupants: 34
- Passengers: 30
- Crew: 4
- Fatalities: 8
- Survivors: 26

Flugfélag Íslands Flight 704 was an aircraft accident involving the controlled flight into terrain (CFIT) of a Fokker F27 Friendship on the island of Mykines in Faroe Islands, on 26 September 1970 at 10:56. The Flugfélag Íslands aircraft was on its way to Vágar Airport, making a pass over Mykines before crashing into the highest peak of the island. Of the 34 passenger and crew on board, 8 died in the crash. The captain and 7 passengers, all seated on the left side of the plane, were killed. 26 passengers and crew survived, some with serious injuries. Three passengers hiked for an hour to reach Mykines village to alert the authorities. Most of the villagers went up the mountain to aid the survivors before the arrival of the Danish patrol vessel F348 Hvidbjørnen.

== Aircraft ==
The aircraft was a Fokker F27 Friendship, registered TF-FIL and jointly owned by Flugfélag Íslands and Scandinavian Airlines (SAS). It was operated by Flugfélag Íslands under the Icelandair brand.

== Accident ==
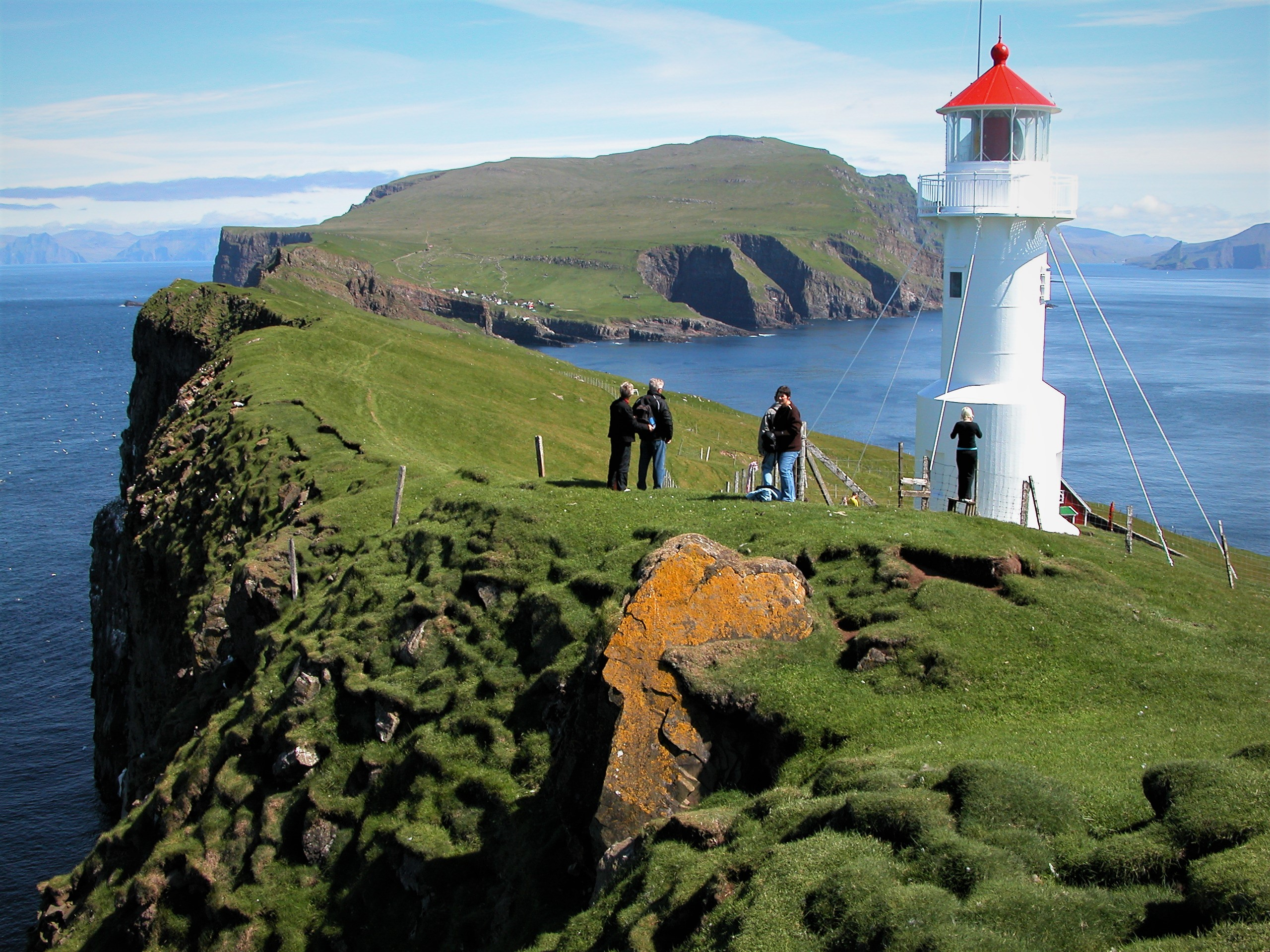
Mykines seen from Mykineshólmur

The Fokker F-27 TF-FIL, listed as flight FI 704, was originally scheduled to fly from Reykjavík, Iceland, to Vágar, Faroe Islands, on 23 September 1970 but due to fog in Vágar the flight was delayed and again the day after. On 25 September TF-FIL left Reykjavík with an estimated arrival over the "MY" radio beacon near Vágar of 15:52. Due to fog at Vágar, TF-FIL was unable to land and continued on to Bergen Airport in Norway and landed there at 18:22. The following day weather had improved and Flight 704 left Bergen at 08:22 in the morning. The plane arrived over Mykines at about 10:20 but due to foggy conditions, it went into a holding pattern. At 10:52 TF-FIL acknowledged that they would now turn around to the MY beacon and initiate a landing procedure. At about 10:55 TF-FIL reported that it was inbound over MY and descending. About one minute later, the aircraft impacted on the slopes of the highest point of Mykines.

== Cause ==
The cause of the accident was that Flight 704 began the descent through cloud procedure from a starting point other than over "MY" NDB. During this procedure the aircraft hit close to the highest point of Mykines at an altitude of about 1500 ft. The reason for starting the procedure from a position other than "MY", was probably an interference caused by Flight 704's weather radar, which caused the ADF to give the crew an erroneous indication that they were passing "MY" NDB.

== Media ==
- Flogvanlukkan í Mykinesi – a two-part Faroese documentary about the crash by Dagmar Joensen-Næs.
- Martröð í Mykinesi - a book about the crash by Magnús Þór Hafsteinsson and Grækaris Djurhuus Magnussen
