= Reykjavík Airport =

Domestic airport in Iceland

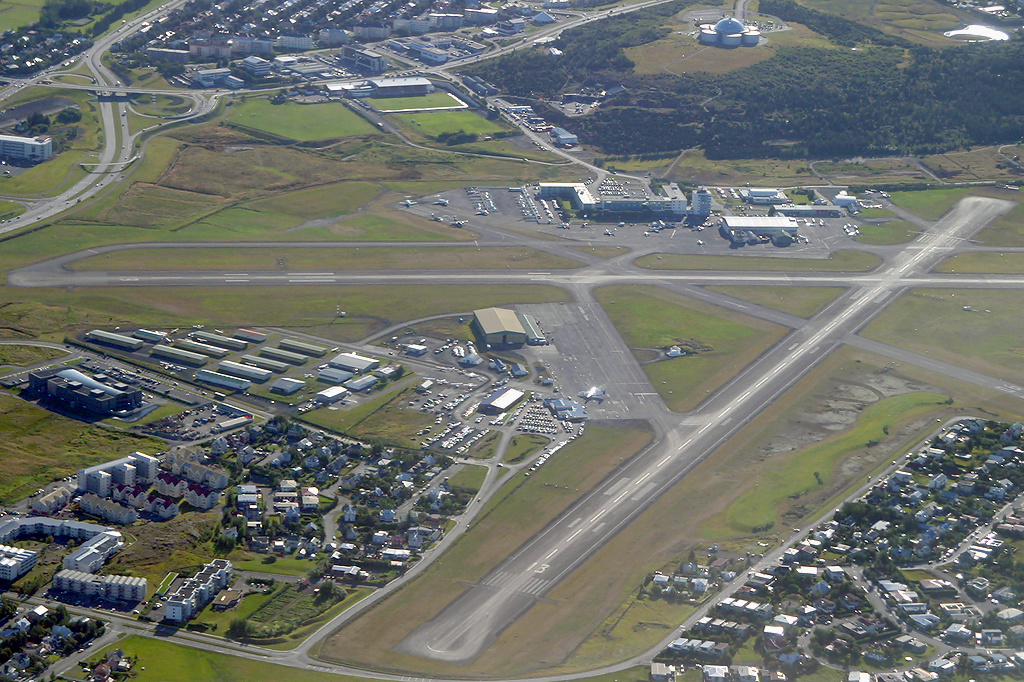
- IATA: RKV; ICAO: BIRK

Summary
- Airport type: Public
- Owner: Isavia
- Serves: Reykjavík, Iceland
- Opened: 3 September 1919; 107 years ago
- Elevation AMSL: 44 ft (13 m)
- Coordinates: 64°07′48″N 021°56′26″W
- Website: isavia.is

Map
- Location of Airport in Iceland

Runways
Direction	Length		Surface
Direction	m	ft	Surface
01/19	1,566	5,140	Asphalt
13/31	1,230	4,034	Asphalt

Statistics
- Passengers (2018): 400,044
- Aircraft Movements (2018): 64,190
- Sources: AIP Iceland Statistics: Isavia Aviation Fact File 2011

Reykjavík Airport (Icelandic: Reykjavíkurflugvöllur; IATA: RKV, ICAO: BIRK) is the main domestic airport serving Reykjavík, the capital of Iceland. The airport is located about two kilometres (1 1/4 miles) from the city centre. It is the domestic hub of Icelandair flights and has two runways. Reykjavík Airport is owned and operated by the state enterprise Isavia.

Having shorter runways than the larger Keflavík International Airport, which is sited 50 kilometres (30 mi) out of town, it serves only domestic flights within Iceland and limited Greenland flights. The airport also services medivac, private aviation and general aviation.

It can also serve as alternate airport for flights inbound towards Keflavík, in case of adverse weather conditions there. To distinguish from the larger Keflavík International Airport outside Reykjavík, it is sometimes unofficially in English called Reykjavik City Airport (also by the airport administration), and also Reykjavik Domestic Airport.

== History ==
=== Foundation and early years ===
In the early 20th century the Vatnsmýri area, where the airport is situated today, was mostly uninhabited and the most ideal flat landing site for aircraft in the vicinity of Reykjavík. The small city was barely developed and the Vatnsmýri area was mostly unusable for normal construction due to its marshy conditions.

The first flight from the airport area in Vatnsmýri was on 3 September 1919, with the takeoff of an Avro 504, the first aeroplane in Iceland. Until 1937, there were experiments with airline operations in Vatnsmýri. Throughout the 1930s seaplane flights were predominant in Reykjavík. Flugfélag Akureyrar (now Icelandair) was founded in Akureyri in 1938 and operated seaplane flights to Reykjavík. Seaplane flights were operated in the vicinity of Vatnsmýri in Skerjafjörður and Vatnagarðar. In March 1940, Flugfélag Akureyrar moved its hub to Reykjavík, moving its operations to fixed-wing scheduled flights from the Vatnsmýri area, and changing its name to Flugfélag Íslands.

There were formal plans in the 1930s for an airport in the Vatnsmýri area, but those did not come to fruition before the Second World War. In 1930 and 1931, the Graf Zeppelin airship visited Reykjavík Airport.

=== Construction during WWII ===
In World War II, after Iceland had been occupied by the British Army, the construction of an airport was pertinent for military operations. The Vatnsmýri site was requisitioned and built up as an airport by the British Army. Construction began in October 1940, initially operating with a grass surface. The Black Watch regiment along with a contingent of local Icelandic labourers built the first runway over sunken oil barrels. Part of the Skerjafjörður neighbourhood had to be demolished for the construction of the 13/31 runway. This became RAF Reykjavík.

The current runway layout was established during the British-led construction of the airport. Multiple aircraft hangars and Nissen huts were constructed by the British Army, many of which continue to be used into the 21st century.

During the occupation, domestic and international civilian air traffic was very restricted. The British Royal Air Force operated from the airport during the war, then named Reykjavík Field, or RAF Reykjavik, which was mostly fully operational from March 1941.

=== Post-war Icelandic administration ===
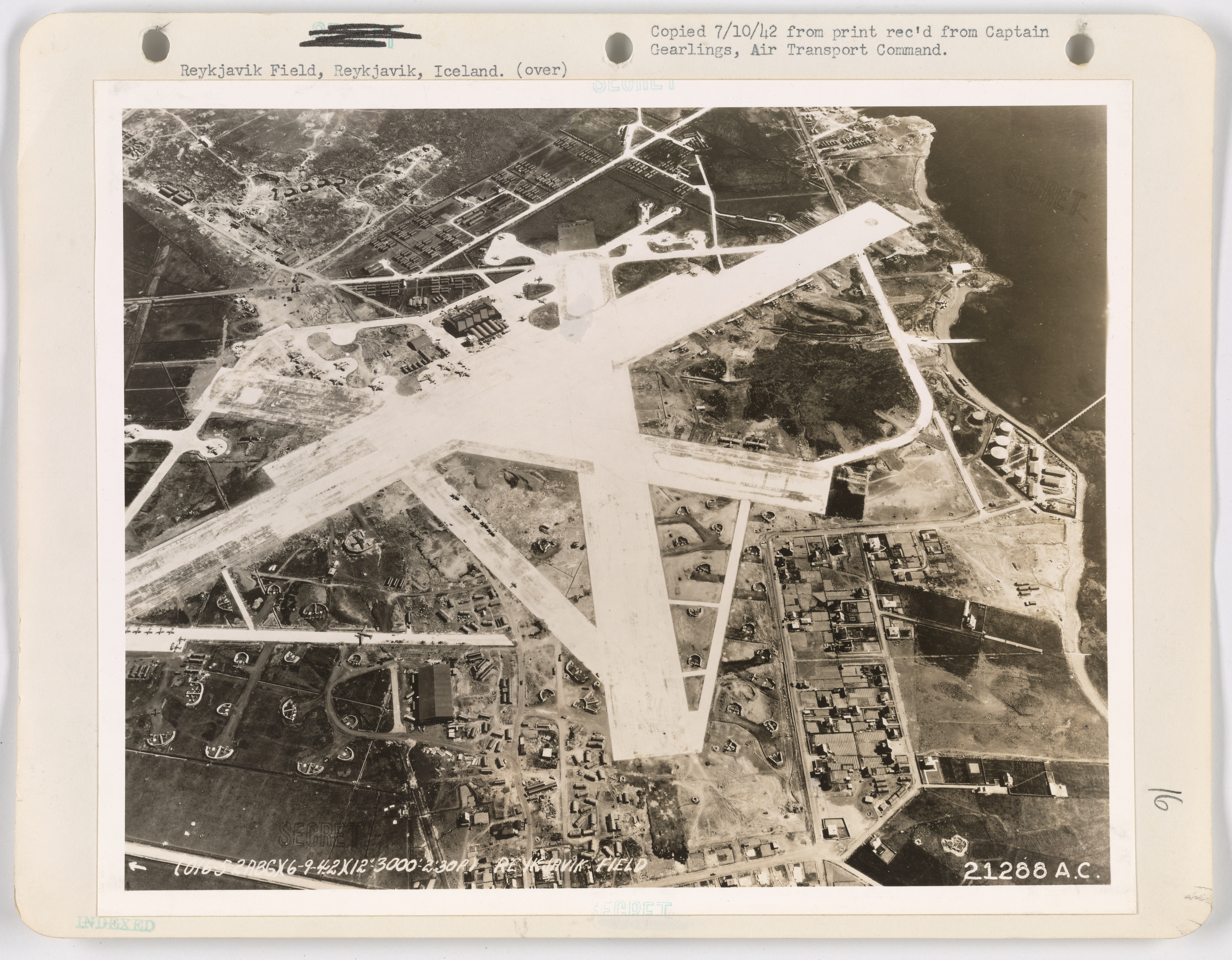
Reykjavík Airport in 1942.

After the end of the occupation of Iceland, on 6 July 1946 the British handed the airport operation over to the Icelandic government and the airport has since been operated by Isavia. Flugfélag Íslands (Icelandair), inherited the ownership in 1947 of a small building constructed by the British Army on the west side of the airport. Since 1947, the building has been gradually expanded but is still in use by Icelandair as a domestic terminal in 2024. By the 1950s, Flugélag Íslands operated flights to Britain and Northern Europe, as well as domestic flights.

Loftleiðir (Icelandic Airlines) commenced flights in 1947 from a small hut on the east side of the airport, initially flying domestic routes. In the 1950s the airline began operating discounted transatlantic flights with a stopover at Reykjavík Airport.

Until the early 1960s, Reykjavík Airport was the main gateway for international flights to and from and Iceland. Both Flugfélag Íslands and Loftleiðir had their hubs at Reykjavík. As passenger volumes increased, Loftleiðir began planning a new large terminal building on the east side of the airport in 1962. The building would include new company offices, a hotel and passenger terminal facilities. In conjunction, the Icelandic government constructed a new airport control tower.

=== Jet-age and relocation of international flights ===
Loftleiðir took delivery of its first Canadair CL-44 aircraft in 1964 and Flugfélag Íslands took delivery of a Boeing 727 as Iceland's first jet aircraft in 1967. These new aircraft were considered too large for regular operation on the shorter runway at Reykjavík Airport. Both airlines began operations of their larger aircraft from the longer runway at Keflavík Airport, but was considered undesirable on account of restricted civilian access arrangements due to its role as a US Military Base, as well as the longer distance to the city.

Discussions arose on the future of Reykjavík Airport in the early 1960s. Both Loftleiðir and Flúgfélag Íslands were of the position that Reykjavík Airport should continue to be the international airport of Iceland and be expanded, or a new airport be constructed in the vicinity of Reykjavík. The government appointed a committee to make a decision on Reykjavík Airport's future. One option was to construct a new airport on the Álftanes peninsula, located approximately 15 km by road from central Reykjavík, which was relatively undeveloped at the time. The other option was to continue to use Keflavík as the international airport and Reykjavík Airport for domestic services. A decision was made to maintain the arrangements at the time, leaving Keflavík Airport for international services and Reykjavík Airport for domestic services. The road from Reykjavík to Keflavík was newly rebuilt and paved by 1965 which greatly improved access to Keflavík Airport from the city.

With no planned enlargement of Reykjavík Airport or development of a new airport elsewhere, Loftleiðir permanently moved all of its operations to Keflavík Airport in 1964, followed by Flufélag Íslands moving all major international services in 1968. Lofleiðir's planned new passenger terminal at Reykjavík would become the Loftleiðir Hotel and offices, which continued to house the headquarters of Icelandair until 2024.

By 1970, Reykjavík Airport was relegated to mostly domestic operations with Flugfélag Íslands Fokker F27 aircraft. Using its domestic fleet, some short-haul international destinations remained, such as flights to the Faroe Islands (Routed onwards to Glasgow and Copenhagen until the 1990s). Flights to Greenland were also operated from Reykjavík Airport. By 1973, the Icelandic Government mandated the merger of Loftleiðir and Flugfélag Íslands, today Icelandair.

=== Development since 2000 ===
After decades of insufficient maintenance, by the 1990s the state of the runway and taxiways was untenable. In 2000, Isavia began a major renovation of the runways which lasted two years. This was followed by a referendum in 2001, with 49.3% of the votes for moving the airport out of the city centre, 48.1% votes for it remaining in place until 2016. The election participation was 37% and was non-binding.

After renovation, the runways 01/19 and 13/31 are 45 m wide, and runway 06/24 is 30 m wide. Runways 01 and 31 only use visual approach, while runway 19 has ILS CAT I/NBD-DME approach, and runway 13 has LLZ-DME/NDB-DME approach. The lights for the runways were updated with LIH Wedge for all runways. The runway 06/24 became permanently closed in 2019, as development was agreed on its flight path.

Icelandair had its head office (built earlier by Loftleiðir) at the airport until 2024.

Eagle Air, a regional domestic airline, operated from its own smaller terminal on the eastern side of the airport (64°7′46″N 21°55′59″W) until its demise in 2024. This terminal was briefly absorbed by Mýflug as a part of a merger, but it too stopped operating scheduled flights in early 2025.

==== International services ====
Reykjavík Airport used to serve more scheduled international flights to Greenland and the Faroe Islands until around 2020. Until 2018, the Faroese airline Atlantic Airways operated flights to Reykjavík Airport using Airbus A319 aircraft. In September 2018, Atlantic Airways moved their operations to Keflavík Airport, due to their plans to operate Airbus A320 aircraft which are too large for Reykjavík Airport. Atlantic Airways was the last regularly scheduled passenger operator of jet aircraft at Reykjavík Airport.

Icelandair's De Havilland Canada Dash 8 turboprop aircraft are based at the airport and served flights to Nuuk, Ilulissat, Kulusuk and Narsarsuaq in Greenland. Icelandair moved all of their Greenland-bound flights to Keflavík Airport in 2022, to allow easier onward connections. This left only Norlandair's limited service to Nerlerit Inaat in Greenland, operated using De Havilland Canada Twin Otter aircraft, as the only international service as of 2024.

== Future and proposed closure ==
Since the 1960s, the future of the airport has been uncertain. As larger aircraft emerged in the jet-age, international services were relocated to Keflavík Airport by 1967 due to the unsuitability of the shorter runways at Reykjavík Airport. Since then, the airport was downgraded to serving mostly as a domestic airport with limited international service. The first proposals emerged in the 1960s regarding future development of the airport including redeveloping the existing airport or relocation to Álftanes peninsula in the vicinity of Reykjavík. Proposals from the 1970s included a new terminal on the southeast side of the airport as well as new aprons and runway extensions. By the 1970s, the area around the city had grown around the airport, which is now located in the western part of the city.

Local, rural and national stakeholders have conflicting views on the future of the airport and the effects of new development, closure or maintaining the status quo. Generally, proponents of keeping the airport in its current location note its importance as a diversion airport, role in medivac flights and domestic connectivity to rural areas. Opponents consider its current location unsuitable due to the large valuable land area it occupies in central Reykjavík, local noise pollution and environmental issues.

The airport remained on the Reykjavík city council masterplan until 2014, when it was redesignated as a new development area and the airport in its current location was due to be closed by 2030 or later according to the city council's plan. The Reykjavík city council publishes the city masterplan which directs future development and land use, however most of the land is owned by the Icelandic state, and the state-owned Isavia operates the airport.

The debate about the future of the airport generally focuses on three major options:

- leaving the airport as it is
- demolishing the airport and building a new airport elsewhere in the vicinity of Reykjavík or the wider capital region.
- demolishing the airport and moving all flight services to Keflavík Airport

In 2001, there was a local referendum in Reykjavik on the matter, keep Reykjavík Airport at present location or move air traffic elsewhere within 15 years, where the result was fairly equal but a small overweight (49.3% against 48.1%) moving the traffic. However, the turnout was only 37% and referendum was local.

An agreement was reached between Reykjavik city council and the Icelandic state to close the shortest runway, 06/24. The decommissioning occurred in 2019 and some land adjacent to the runway began development into new housing.

No decision has been made to close or relocate Reykjavík Airport as of 2025.

== Terminal and facilities ==
Scheduled flights operated by Icelandair and Norlandair are handled by the Icelandair-owned terminal building on the west side of the airport (64°7′54″N 21°56′47″W).

Isavia have their head offices on the airport property. The Icelandic Coast Guard's aeronautical division is based at the airport.

Many smaller charter airlines and helicopter operators are based at the airport, as well as private aviation hangar and storage areas. A number of flight schools are also based at the airport. Fixed-base operators (FBOs) are present at the airport, servicing business jets.

== Airlines and destinations ==
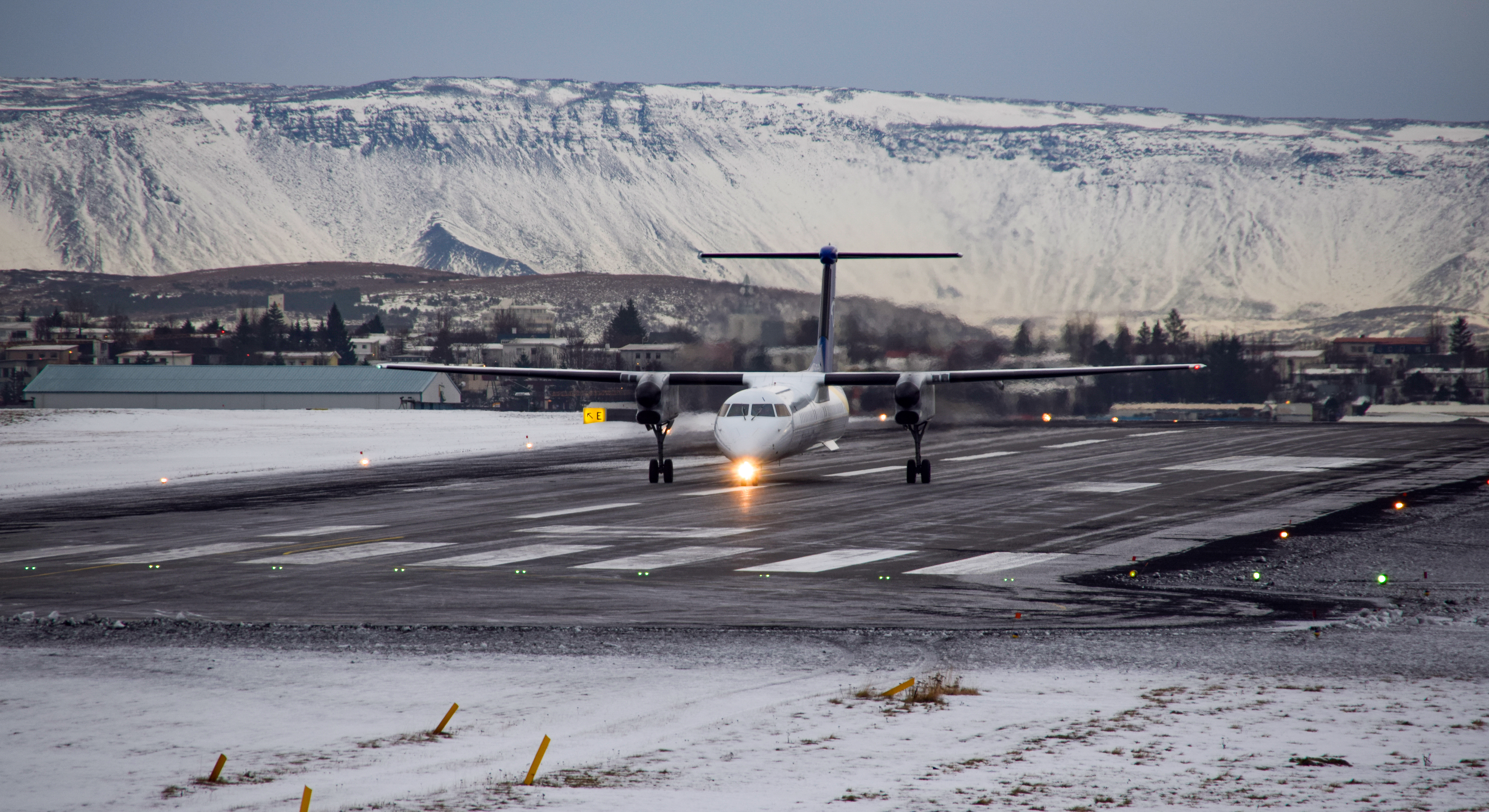
Icelandair De Havilland Canada Dash 8-400 at Reykjavík Airport.

The following airlines operate regular scheduled and charter flights at Reykjavík Airport:

Airlines	Destinations
Icelandair	Akureyri, Egilsstaðir, Höfn, Ísafjörður
Norlandair	Bíldudalur, Gjögur, Nerlerit Inaat; Seasonal: Vestmannaeyjar

== Ground transportation ==
The airport is located approximately 2 km from the Reykjavík city centre. The Hringbraut (Route 49) main road passes to the north of the airport. Strætó operates local city buses to the main terminal on the west side of the airport, as well as bus services on the east side serving the charter terminals.

BSÍ is a major bus terminal, located 1.6 km (1.0 mi) from the main airport terminal. At the bus terminal, Strætó provides more frequent bus services to areas around Reykjavik. Private bus companies connect Keflavík International Airport and Reykjavik Airport, a 50 km journey and at least three hours of connection time between international to domestic flights is recommended.

== Accidents and incidents ==
- On 14 April 1942, Flugfélag Íslands Smyrill crashed shortly after takeoff, killing merchant and former athlete Axel Kristjánsson and an officer from the British occupation force in Iceland, while injuring two others.
- On 31 January 1951, a Douglas DC-3 from Flugfélag Íslands, christened Glitfaxi, crashed in Faxaflói while on approach to the airport, killing all 20 people aboard. Known as the Glitfaxi air crash, it remains the second deadliest air crash in Iceland behind the 1947 Héðinsfjörður air crash.
- On 27 December 1980, Douglas C-47B N54605 of Visionair International was damaged beyond repair in a storm at Reykjavik Airport.
- On 11 March 1986, the pilots of a Fokker F27 Friendship from Flugleiðir, with registration TL-FLO, aborted takeoff after hearing unusual noise coming from the plane but were unable to stop it before it reached the end of the runway due to wet conditions. The plane went off the end of the runway, hit a concrete ditch resulting in the front landing gear breaking off, went through a fence at the edge of the runway and came to a halt on the middle of the Suðurgata, a busy traffic street, barely missing a large oil truck that had just passed by. All 45 people on board escaped without injuries.
- On 8 July 1986, a privately owned single engine Socata Rallye Tampico crashed during takeoff and slid into Flugleiðir's Fokker F27 Friendship, with registration TF-FLM, and caught fire. The Fokker was deboarding at the time and a stewardess managed to push three passengers out of the way just before the Tampico hit. The flight engineer of the Fokker had grabbed a fire extinguisher when he saw the plane crash and managed to contain the fire before another employee of Flugleiðir came with a second extinguisher and helped him put the fire out before it could reach the fuel gushing out of the damaged airplane. All four people on board the small plane were pulled out with minor injuries.
- On 3 August 1988, a CASA 212 Aviocar 200, belonging to the Canadian company Geoterrex crashed 900 metres short of the runway with the loss of the 3 Canadian scientists onboard. The crash was found to be a result of an incorrectly installed speeder spring in the right propeller governor. During the ILS approach, the props on the right side suddenly went into a setting called "ground flat" (or possibly slightly into reverse). This gave a huge power difference between the left and the right engines.
- On 7 August 2000, a Cessna T210L Centurion II aircraft, TF-GTI, operated by Leiguflug Ísleifs Ottesen, crashed into the sea in Skerjafjörður due to fuel deficiency. The plane, which was transporting passengers who had been attending the annual Þjóðhátíð national festival in Vestmannaeyjar, had been ordered to do a go-around due to the presence of another plane on the runway. All six people on board died in the crash or in the following months.
