= 2000 Skerjafjörður plane crash =

Aviation incident in Skerjafjörður, Iceland

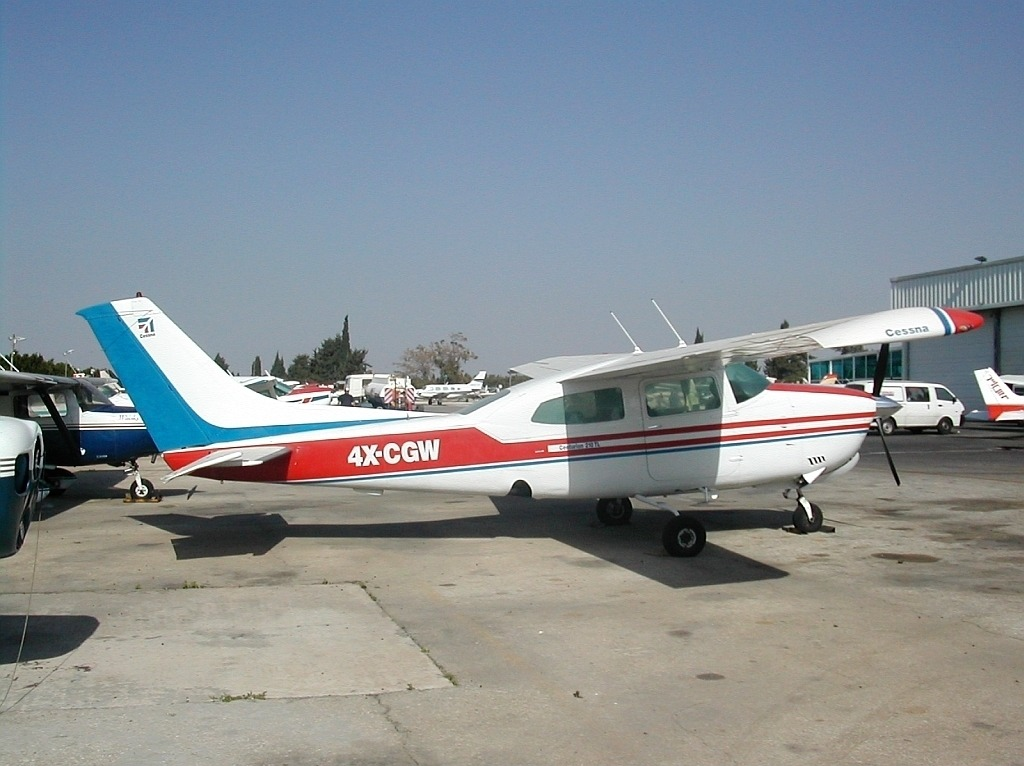
- A Cessna 210 Centurion, similar to the aircraft involved

Accident
- Date: 7 August 2000
- Summary: Fuel exhaustion, pilot fatigue
- Site: Skerjafjörður, Iceland

Aircraft
- Aircraft type: Cessna T210L Centurion II
- Operator: Leiguflug Ísleifs Ottesen
- Registration: TF-GTI
- Flight origin: Vestmannaeyjar Airport, Iceland
- Destination: Reykjavík Airport, Iceland
- Occupants: 6
- Passengers: 5
- Crew: 1
- Fatalities: 6
- Survivors: 0

The 2000 Skerjafjörður plane crash happened on 7 August 2000 when a Cessna T210L Centurion II aircraft, TF-GTI, operated by Leiguflug Ísleifs Ottesen with six people on board crashed into the sea in Skerjafjörður, just outside Reykjavík, Iceland.

== Background ==
The plane was on a scheduled flight from Vestmannaeyjar Airport to Reykjavík Airport with passengers who had been attending the annual Þjóðhátíð, the largest national festival in Iceland. It was the 22nd flight of the day for the pilot.

== Accident details ==
=== Flight ===
The plane was about to touch the runway in Reykjavík when the pilot received an order from the control tower to abort as another plane was on the runway. The pilot then raised the flight and intended to make another circle. The aircraft had reached an altitude of about 500 feet when the engine lost power and stalled. Shortly after, the plane hit the sea in Skerjaförður, about 350 meters from land, broke apart and sank at a depth of about six meters with everyone on board. The plane rested on its left side, with the right wing sticking out of the sea. A nearby barge, owned by a diving company, arrived at the scene few minutes after the crash and within 30 minutes of the accident, divers recovered five of the six occupants from the wreckage and brought to shore.

=== Fatalities ===
One of the passengers died at the scene of the accident, as rescuers were unable to recover him from the passenger site of the cockpit until the plane was lifted from the sea. The pilot and one of the passengers were pronounced dead shortly after arriving at the hospital and another passenger died a few days later. The last two passengers died within a year from their injuries.

== Cause ==
In its report, the Aircraft Accident Investigation Board concluded that the cause of the accident was that the plane ran out of fuel, with contributing factors being the pilots fatigue.

== Aftermath ==
The crash led to several rule changes regarding aviation safety in Iceland, including reducing the number of landings in Vestmannaeyjar per 30 minutes to eight to limit the number of aircraft in the airspace at any given time. Following the rule changes, there were no fatal air accidents in the country for nine years, a notable reduction from the almost yearly fatal accidents from the decade before.
