= Vágar Airport =

Airport in the Faroe Islands

Vágar Airport Vága Floghavn
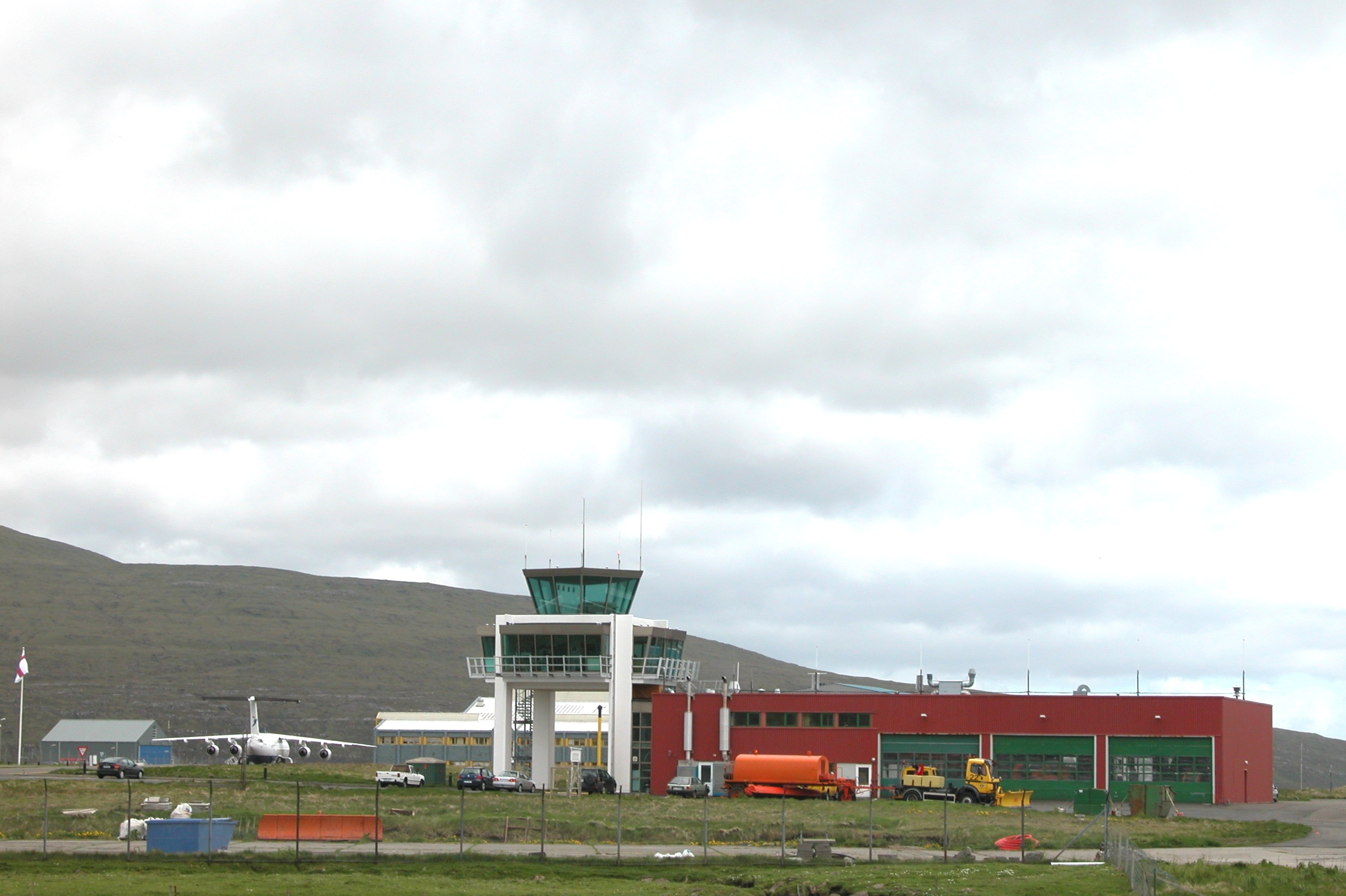
- IATA: FAE; ICAO: EKVG

Summary
- Airport type: Public
- Operator: Civil Aviation Administration
- Location: Sørvágur, Faroe Islands
- Hub for: Atlantic Airways
- Elevation AMSL: 280 ft (85 m)
- Coordinates: 62°03′49″N 007°16′38″W
- Website: fae.fo

Map
- Location in the Faroe Islands

Runways
Direction	Length		Surface
Direction	m	ft	Surface
12/30	1,800	5,906	Asphalt

Statistics (2022)
- Passengers: 406,453
- Aircraft movements: 5,521
- Cargo (metric tons): 9,996
- Source: Faroe Islands AIP at Naviair; Statistics

Vágar Airport (Faroese: Vága Floghavn) (IATA: FAE, ICAO: EKVG) is the only airport in the Faroe Islands, and is located 1 NM (1.9 km; 1.2 mi) east of the village of Sørvágur, on the island of Vágar and 46 km (29 miles) west of the capital Tórshavn. It is the main operating base for Faroese flag carrier Atlantic Airways.

== History ==
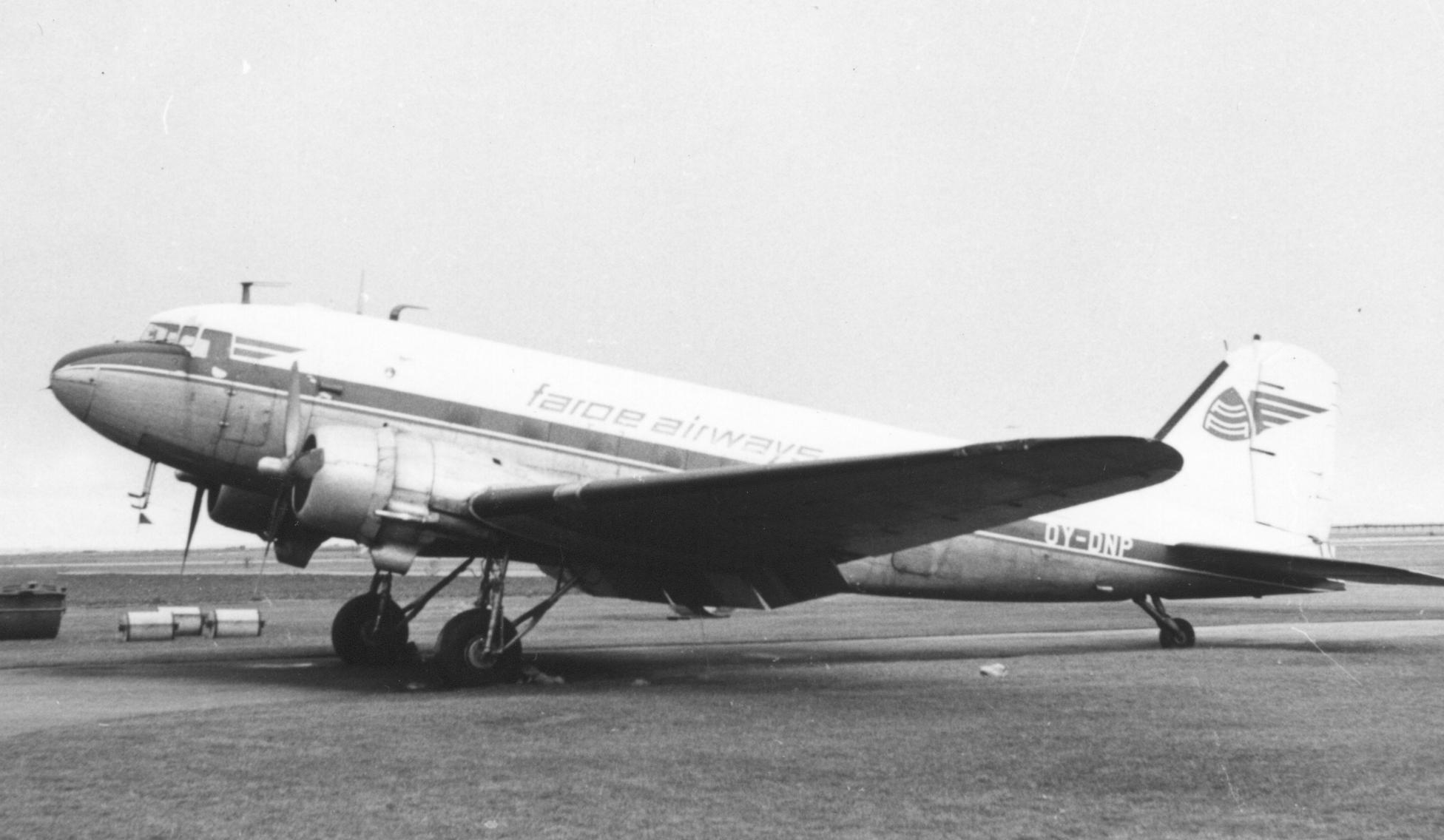
Faroe Airways Douglas DC-3

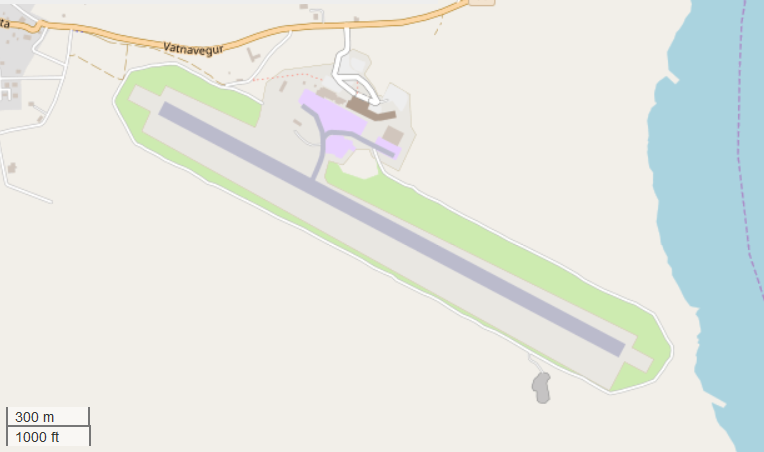
Map of the airport

=== Early years ===
The airport was built by British Army Royal Engineers during World War II on the island of Vágar; the site was known as RAF Vagar/Vaagar (Royal Air Force). The site was chosen mainly because it was hard to see from the surrounding waters and any potential German warship. The first aeroplane landed here in Autumn 1942. (See British occupation of the Faroe Islands in World War II). British engineers had similarly first built Reykjavík Airport in Iceland in 1940, then known as RAF Reykjavik, following the British Occupation of Iceland.

After the war, Vágar airfield was abandoned and left unused until 1963, when it was reopened as a civilian airport at the initiative of two Sørvágur residents, Hugo Fjørðoy and Lars Larsen. The two worked with the Icelandic airline Icelandair, which began the scheduled flights to Bergen, Copenhagen and Glasgow using a Douglas DC-3 aircraft. In 1964 a separate airline, Faroe Airways, operated flights, first using chartered aircraft but in 1965 they bought a DC-3 from the Swedish airline Linjeflyg. The company ceased operating on 28 September 1967. In the 1970s, Icelandair was operating Fokker F27 Friendship aircraft into the airport with weekly nonstop service to Glasgow/Bergen and Reykjavík Airport, continuing into the 1990s. In 1988, Atlantic Airways was flying British Aerospace BAe 146-200 jet service nonstop to Copenhagen. Atlantic Airways later entered a partnership with Icelandair in 1995 and began flying its BAe 146 jet to Reykjavík Airport and to Narsarsuaq Airport in Greenland. Icelandair ceased operating their own flights to Vágar in 2004, albeit retaining their partnership with Atlantic Airways. Until 2004 Maersk Air also operated flights into the airport with Boeing 737-500 jetliners to Copenhagen. By 2005, Atlantic Airways was the only regularly scheduled operator at Vágar Airport.

=== Development since the 2000s ===
Until 2002 travel from the airport to most locations in the Faroe Islands including the capital Tórshavn required a car ferry, but since the Vágatunnilin, a tolled road tunnel, was opened in 2002, travel has been made much easier by giving direct road access to the neighbouring island of Streymoy, where Tórshavn is located.

Vágar Airport was briefly served by low-cost airline FaroeJet in 2006.

The runway was extended from 1,250 m (4,100 ft) to 1,799 m (5,902 ft) in 2011, allowing a greater variety of aircraft types to be used, and more distant destinations to be introduced. Construction work started in May 2010, and in December 2011, the extended runway was opened and put into use for the first time. Previously, jet aircraft with short airfield performance such as the British Aerospace BAe 146 (which ceased to be produced 2001) were preferred for use into the airport (although Maersk Air operated flights with Boeing 737-500 aircraft), and then the most distant destination was Copenhagen, 1,300 km (810 mi). The Airbus A319 of Atlantic Airways is able to utilise the extended runway, and services with this type with Atlantic Airways began in March 2012. A new airport terminal opened in June 2014 with increased passenger capacity.

In March 2016, Scandinavian Airlines (SAS) began to fly from Copenhagen to Vágar, the first airline other than Atlantic to do so in many years. SAS has had trouble with fog landings which caused cancellations. But in February 2019 SAS started using the Required Navigation Performance procedure, which allows landings in more fog, but requires special onboard equipment, pilot training and approval from the aviation administration. Atlantic Airways began using the system in 2012 as first airline in Europe. As Atlantic Airways transitioned their fleet from Airbus A319s to A320s, they moved their Iceland flights to Keflavík International Airport in 2018, due to aircraft size restrictions at Reykjavík Airport.

In August 2023, Atlantic Airways inaugurated seasonal service to Stewart Airport, 110 kilometres (70 mi) from New York City. The service was later cancelled.

In 2024, Icelandair resumed service to Iceland in summer 2024, operating a seasonal service with De Havilland Canada Dash-8 aircraft from Reykjavík-Keflavík International Airport.

== Management ==
The airport is currently managed by the Danish Transport Authority, although the ownership of the airport was handed over to the Faroese government in May 2007.

== Airlines and destinations ==
=== Passenger ===
The airlines in the table below offer regular passenger scheduled and seasonal flights at Vágar Airport.

Airlines	Destinations
Atlantic Airways	Billund, Copenhagen, Oslo, Reykjavík–Keflavík; Seasonal: Aalborg, Barcelona, Edinburgh, Gran Canaria, London–Gatwick, Palma de Mallorca, Paris–Charles de Gaulle
Atlantic Airways Helicopter	Dímun, Froðba, Hattarvík, Kirkja, Klaksvík, Koltur, Mykines, Skúvoy, Svínoy, Tórshavn
Icelandair	Reykjavík–Keflavík
Scandinavian Airlines	Seasonal: Copenhagen

Occasional public charter flights are operated by major European airlines, e.g. Wizzair and Austrian Airlines, for example to fly supporters to football qualification matches. There are also fairly frequent corporate charter flights (seats not available to public) done by e.g. Widerøe. The extended runway and better instrument landing system has made it easier for airlines other than Atlantic Airways to land at Vágar.

=== Cargo ===
Airlines	Destinations
FarCargo	Brussels, Dublin, Liege

== Ground transport ==
There are bus services about 10 times each direction per day between the airport and Tórshavn. They take one hour. The road distance to Tórshavn is 47 km (29 mi). Since 2002, the "Vágatunnilin" tunnel (4.9 km (3.0 mi)) connects the airport and the Vágar island to the main towns and villages in the Faroe Islands.

== Accidents and incidents ==
- 26 September 1970: a Fokker F27 Friendship, with registration TF-FIL, from Flugfélag Íslands on flight from Bergen to Vágar Airport, crashed in bad weather on Mykines. The captain and 7 passengers, all seated on the left side of the plane, were killed. 26 passengers and crew survived, some with serious injuries. Three passengers hiked for an hour to reach Mykines village to alert the authorities. Most of the villagers went up the mountain to aid the survivors before the arrival of the Danish patrol vessel F348 Hvidbjørnen. A marble memorial was placed in the church.
- 25 January 1975: a Fokker F27 aircraft from Maersk Air registered as OY-APB attempted to land on a wet and icy runway. Without having been informed of the conditions, the pilots veered the aircraft off the runway and collided with terrain.
- 6 July 1987: a Partenavia P.68 aircraft registered as G-SPOT, operated by Octavia Air, crashed on approach to Vágar Airport in poor weather conditions and limited visibility. The aircraft struck a rocky face (150 metres; 500' high) located 15 km (10 miles) southwest from the airport. All three occupants were killed.
- 3 August 1996: a Gulfstream III of the Danish Air Force crashed during final approach to Vágar Airport in bad weather and poor visibility. Extreme atmospheric turbulences caused the pilots to lose control; the aircraft suddenly rolled 180 degrees and crashed on the slope of a mountain located 2 km (1¼ miles) short of runway (near Selvík stream, west of Sørvágur 62°04′15.4″N 7°21′03.6″W). Nine people, including the Danish Chief of Defence Jørgen Garde and his wife, perished as the aircraft collided with high terrain surrounding the airport.

== See also ==
- List of airports in the Faroe Islands
- List of the largest airports in the Nordic countries
