= Axel Kristjánsson =

Icelandic athlete and merchant

- Born: August 18, 1892; Sauðárkrókur, Danish Iceland
- Died: April 16, 1942 (aged 49); Reykjavík, Kingdom of Iceland
- Occupation: Merchant
- Known for: Glíma
- Spouse: Hólmfríður Jónsdóttir (m. 1917)
- Children: 3

Axel Kristjánsson (18 August 1892 – 16 April 1942) was an Icelandic athlete and merchant. A well known athlete in Iceland, he was part of a group selected to showcase the Icelandic combat sport Glíma at the 1912 Summer Olympics.

== Early life ==
Axel was born in Sauðárkrókur to merchant Kristján Gíslason and Björg Eiríksdóttir. He grew up in Sauðárkrókur until 1907 when he went to attend the Gagnfræðiskólinn in Akureyri. He returned home a year later due to an illness but started attending Verzlunarskóli Íslands in 1909. In 1912, he was part of a group of eight Icelanders to showcase Glíma at the 1912 Summer Olympics In 1917, he married Hólmfríður Jónsdóttir and together they moved to Akureyri in 1920 where he later started his merchant business. In 1937, he became the Consul of Norway.

== Death ==
On 14 April 1942, Axel was seriously injured when the Flugfélag Íslands' aircraft Smyrill crashed shortly after takeoff from Reykjavík airport. He died two days later from his injuries at a military hospital in Reykjavík.

== Personal life ==
Axel had three children with his wife, Hólmfríður. Their son-in-law was the chief of the Icelandic Police, Agnar Kofoed Hansen. Two years after Axel's death, Hólmfríður died from an illness.
