= Icelandair Group =

Icelandic travel industry corporation

Icelandair Group hf.
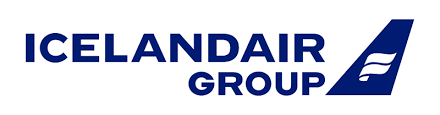
- Type: Hlutafélag
- Traded as: Nasdaq Iceland: ICEAIR
- Industry: Aviation, travel
- Founded: 1937; 89 years ago
- Headquarters: Hafnarfjörður, Iceland
- Key people: Bogi Nils Bogason; (president & CEO); Guðmundur Hafsteinsson; (chairman)
- Revenue: ▲US$1.26 billion (2022)
- Operating income: ▲US$18.9 million (2022)
- Net income: ▲US$−5.8 million (2022)
- Total assets: ▲US$1.41 billion (2022)
- Total equity: ▲US$273 million (2022)
- Number of employees: 3,045 (2022)
- Website: icelandairgroup.com

Icelandair Group hf. is an Icelandic travel industry corporation, the owner and holding company of the airline Icelandair and several other travel industry companies in Iceland. The group's headquarters are in Hafnarfjörður. The corporation is the largest in Iceland, with 125 billion ISK in revenue in 2013.

== Operations ==
Icelandair Group focuses on the international airline and tourism sectors, with Iceland as the cornerstone of its international route network. The business concept of the group is built exclusively on Icelandair's route network and on marketing Iceland as a year-round destination.

During 2013, the group employed an average of 2,850 full-time employees, 1,387 of whom were employed by Icelandair. The number of employees had been rising steadily from 2,028 in 2010.

Icelandair Group is the parent company of nine subsidiaries that form the two business segments of Route Network and Tourism Services. In addition to passenger flights operated by Icelandair, the group has vast interests in most aspects of Icelandic tourism and aviation, including hotel chains, travel agencies, domestic airlines and cargo, support services, as well as fledgling ACMI and lease operations.

== History ==
Icelandair Group traces its roots to 1937 when the airline Flugfélag Akureyrar, was founded at Akureyri on the north coast of Iceland. In 1943, the company moved its headquarters to the capital Reykjavík and changed its name to Air Iceland, which later assumed the international trade name Icelandair.

In 1944, another Icelandic airline was founded, Loftleiðir, by three young pilots returning from flight training in Canada. Initially, both companies concentrated on Icelandic domestic air services but then began international flights between Iceland and other countries. In 1953, Loftleiðir pioneered low-fare services across the North Atlantic and became quite successful for the greater part of two decades.

In 1973, however, it was agreed to merge both Air Iceland and Loftleiðir under a new holding company, Flugleiðir. In October 1979, Flugleiðir assumed all operating responsibilities of its two parents and decided to use Icelandair as its international trade name, retaining the Flugleiðir name for the Icelandic domestic market.

In January 2003, Flugleiðir became a holding company with 11 subsidiaries in the travel and tourist industry in Iceland with Icelandair being the largest subsidiary. In 2005, the name Flugleiðir was changed to FL Group which would concentrate on investment, while Icelandair continued its flight operations under the aegis of a separate company, Icelandair Group. The board of directors of FL Group announced in February 2006 its intention to list Icelandair Group on Iceland Stock Exchange. Then in December of the same year, the company was listed as ICEAIR on the ICEX.

The next year, FL Group landed in dire financial straits, and then Icelandair Group was hit by the 2008–2012 Icelandic financial crisis. In 2009, Icelandair Group started a financial restructuring, which was successfully completed in February 2011.

On 5 November 2018, Icelandair Group announced that it had made a purchase agreement to acquire all shares of competitor WOW Air. The intention was that, after approval of the agreement by shareholders, the two airlines would continue to operate as separate brands. However, the merger was abandoned less than a month later. WOW Air then held talks with Indigo Partners; after those talks failed on 21 March 2019, Icelandair Group briefly but unsuccessfully resumed discussions, before WOW Air's subsequent cessation of operations on 28 March. Icelandair was one of several airlines to propose special "rescue fares" for stranded WOW Air passengers.

Icelandair Group moved its headquarters to Hafnarfjörður in 2024, to consolidate its offices under one roof. Their previous headquarters at Reykjavík Airport were in use for over 50 years, having been built by Loftleiðir.

== Shareholders ==
Most of the shareholders of Icelandair Group are pension and investment funds in Iceland. The Pension Fund of Commerce is the biggest shareholder, with 14.36% of shares at the end of 2013. About 22% of the shares are held by small shareholders with less than 0.70% of the shares each.

== Subsidiaries ==
The subsidiaries of Icelandair Group include:

- Air Iceland Connect
- Icelandair
- Icelandair Cargo

Defunct subsidiaries include:

- Loftleiðir Icelandic
- VITA
