= Loftleiðir =

1944–1979 private Icelandic airline

IATA	ICAO	Call sign
LL^{(1)}	LL^{(1)}	LOFTLEIDIR^{(2)}
- Founded: 1944
- Commenced operations: 1944
- Ceased operations: 1979 (merged in 1973 with Flugfélag Íslands to form Icelandair)
- Hubs: Reykjavík Airport
- Focus cities: John F. Kennedy International Airport; Luxembourg Airport
- Headquarters: Reykjavík, Iceland
- Key people: Alfred Eliasson (co-founder 1944 and CEO from 1953); Kristinn Olsen (co-founder 1944) Sigurdur Olafsson (co-founder 1944)

Notes
- (1) before the mid-1980s, ICAO and IATA codes were the same, both two-letters (2) Callsigns are in English

Loftleiðir (Icelandic pronunciation: [ˈlɔftˈleiːðɪr̥], lit. 'Airways'), internationally known as Icelandic Airlines (abbreviated IAL) or Loftleiðir Icelandic, was a private Icelandic airline headquartered on the grounds of Reykjavík Airport in Reykjavík, which operated mostly trans-Atlantic flights linking Europe and America, pioneering the low-cost flight business strategy on these routes.

In 2003, the name Loftleiðir Icelandic made a comeback to service the skies as Icelandair's aircraft lease and charter flights provider.

== History ==
=== Loftleiðir ===
Loftleiðir (the name being a compound of the Icelandic words for "air" and "way") was founded on 10 March 1944, by Alfreð Elíasson and two other young Icelandic pilots who had just returned from flight training in Canada. The first revenue flight (from Reykjavík to Ísafjörður) took place on 6 April of that year. During the initial years, only domestic routes out of Reykjavík Airport were operated using airplanes of the types Douglas DC-3, Consolidated PBY Catalina, Stinson Reliant, Grumman Goose, Noorduyn Norseman, Avro Anson and Vultee L-1 Vigilant. The first international flight (from Reykjavík to Copenhagen) using a Douglas DC-4 took place on 17 June 1947, the Icelandic National Day. Loftleiðir had expected to take delivery of the DC-4 already in 1946 (the first Icelandic airline to operate an airliner of that size and range), but the delivery was delayed because of the bankruptcy of the interior outfitter. Initially, the DC-4 was deployed on flights to Europe, as well as on chartered flights for third party companies, for example from Britain to South America.

In 1948, Loftleiðir was granted governmental approval to operate passenger services to the United States of America, which were launched in August of that year when a second DC-4 joined the fleet, with New York's Idlewild Airport as first destination. In 1949 and 1950, the DC-4s were leased to U.S. carrier Seaboard & Western Airlines because of the difficult financial situation Loftleiðir was in during that period.

Since Loftleiðir had launched domestic flights in the 1940s, there had been a fierce competition with Flugfélag Íslands, which had prompted the Icelandic government to divide the network between the two airlines, when the originally proposed merger had been rejected. The management of Loftleiðir claimed to have been disfavoured in this measure, and decided to cease all domestic services in 1952, fully concentrating on transatlantic flights henceforth. Typical routings at that time were from New York via Reykjavík to Hamburg or Luxembourg, with intermediate stops at Oslo, Copenhagen, Bergen, Stavanger or Gothenburg.

From 1955 onwards, Luxembourg-Findel Airport was the European starting point for most of Loftleiðir's transatlantic flights. With the introduction of the Douglas DC-6 into the fleet in 1959, the DC-4s were gradually phased out.

In 1964, Loftleiðir started operating its first Canadair CL-44D-4, and two years later the first of its four CL-44Js, a variant of the CL-44D4 stretched on request by Canadair. Loftleiðir was the only passenger operator of the turboprop, which was used as a cargo plane by other airlines. It was the largest passenger aircraft flying over the Atlantic Ocean at that time, carrying up to 189 passengers. Loftleiðir marketed the CL-44J under the name "Rolls-Royce 400 PropJet". This led to the confusion that the CL-44J is sometimes referred to as the Canadair-400. At that time, the company had 1,000 employees.

The late sixties were an exciting time for Loftleiðir. In 1969, the company acquired International Air Bahama, a small airline operating Boeing 707 jets out of the Bahamas, and a year later, Loftleiðir became one of the founders of Cargolux, a thriving cargo airline. Also in 1970, Loftleiðir entered the jet age with its first two stretched Douglas DC-8-63 "Super DC-8" jetliners. In 1971, the company started flying between Iceland and Scandinavia with the slightly smaller DC-8-55.

The growing competition from Flugfélag Íslands and the economic pressure during the 1970s energy crisis led to the merger of the two airlines in 1973 into one holding company, which was called Flugleiðir. In 1979, Flugfélag Íslands and Loftleiðir merged into a new airline, also called Flugleiðir, which later became known as Icelandair.

The Loftleiðir branding re-emerged in 2003, when the newly created wet-lease and charter subsidiary of Icelandair Group was named Loftleiðir Icelandic.

== Pioneering low-cost flights ==
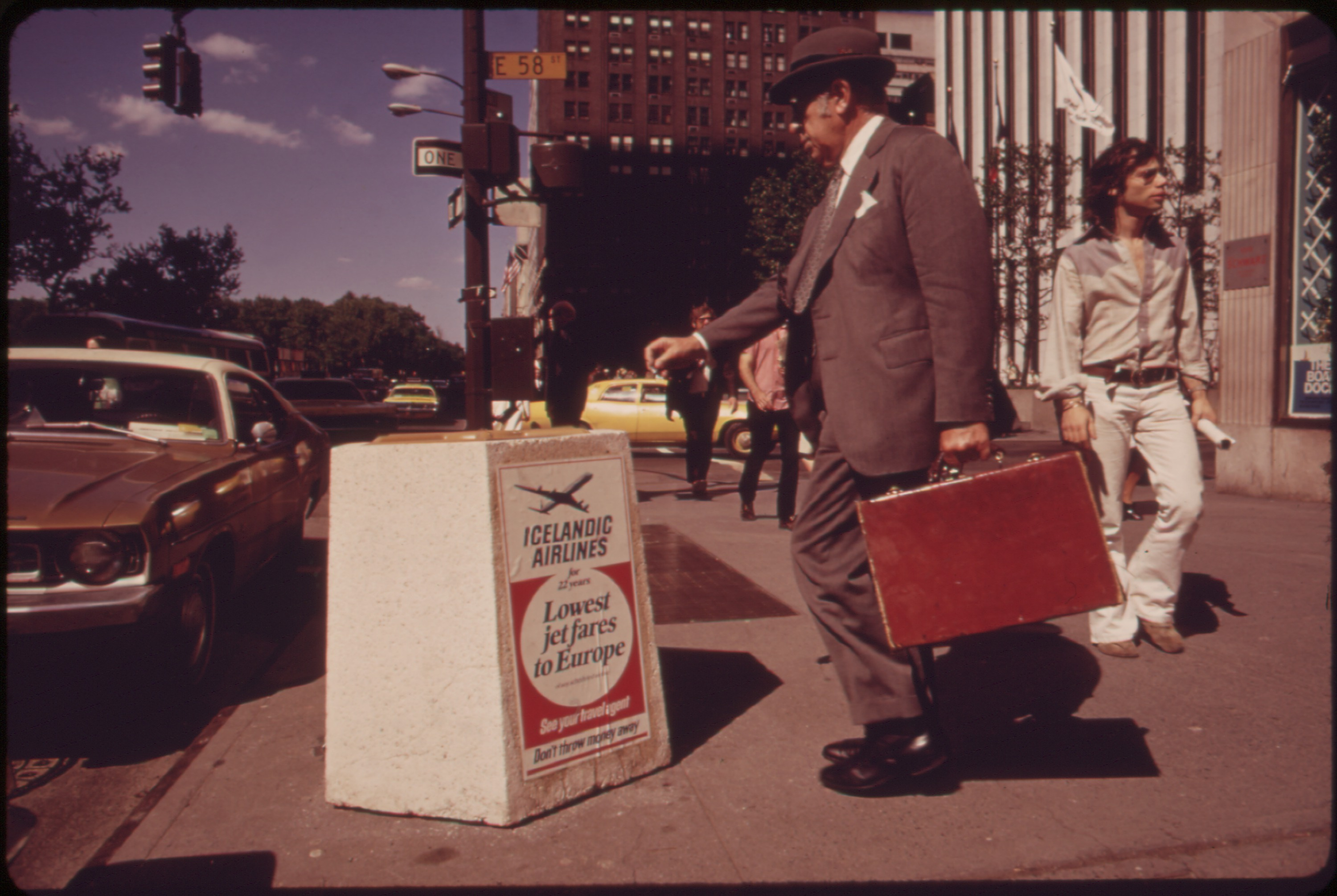
An Icelandic Airlines advertisement from May 1973, in New York's historic Fifth Avenue.

The geographical position of Iceland in the Atlantic Ocean between Europe and America allowed Loftleiðir to offer passenger flights between the two continents with an intermediate stop at its home airport at Reykjavík, thus operating at lower costs because of easier aircraft and crew logistics than its outer European or American competitors. The airline was chosen by many young Americans as a cheap means of travel to Europe, which earned it the title Hippie Airline from the late 1960s. During different state visits to Iceland, Bill and Hillary Clinton both remembered the experience of their flights with Loftleiðir.

In order to comply with the then-valid freedoms of the air restrictions, tickets for transatlantic flights were issued in two parts (to/from Iceland, as Loftleiðir, as an Icelandic airline, was allowed to transport passengers only to and from its country of registry), but stopovers were held as short as one hour, with no changing of the aircraft required. Because Loftleiðir had not joined the International Air Transport Association (IATA), which at that time defined the fares for its member airlines on transatlantic routes, it could offer considerably lower ticket prices. Sigurður Helgason, who had joined the board of the airline in 1953, is credited with introducing this strategy. The New York Times called him a "low-cost travel pioneer."

== Airline co-operations ==
Between 1952 and 1962, Loftleiðir co-operated with the Norwegian airline Braathens SAFE on the transatlantic routes on a codeshare-like basis, as well as maintenance, inspection, overhaul and repairs. When the European focus shifted from Scandinavia to Luxemburg, this partnership was terminated.

International Air Bahama, a small airline based in the Bahamas operating transatlantic Boeing 707 jet service between Nassau and Luxembourg, was acquired in 1969 with International Air Bahama subsequently operating stretched Super Douglas DC-8 jetliners on its transatlantic flights.

In 1970, Loftleiðir became one of the founding shareholders of Cargolux, along with Luxair and several private investors.

== Fleet ==
Over the years, the following aircraft types were operated:

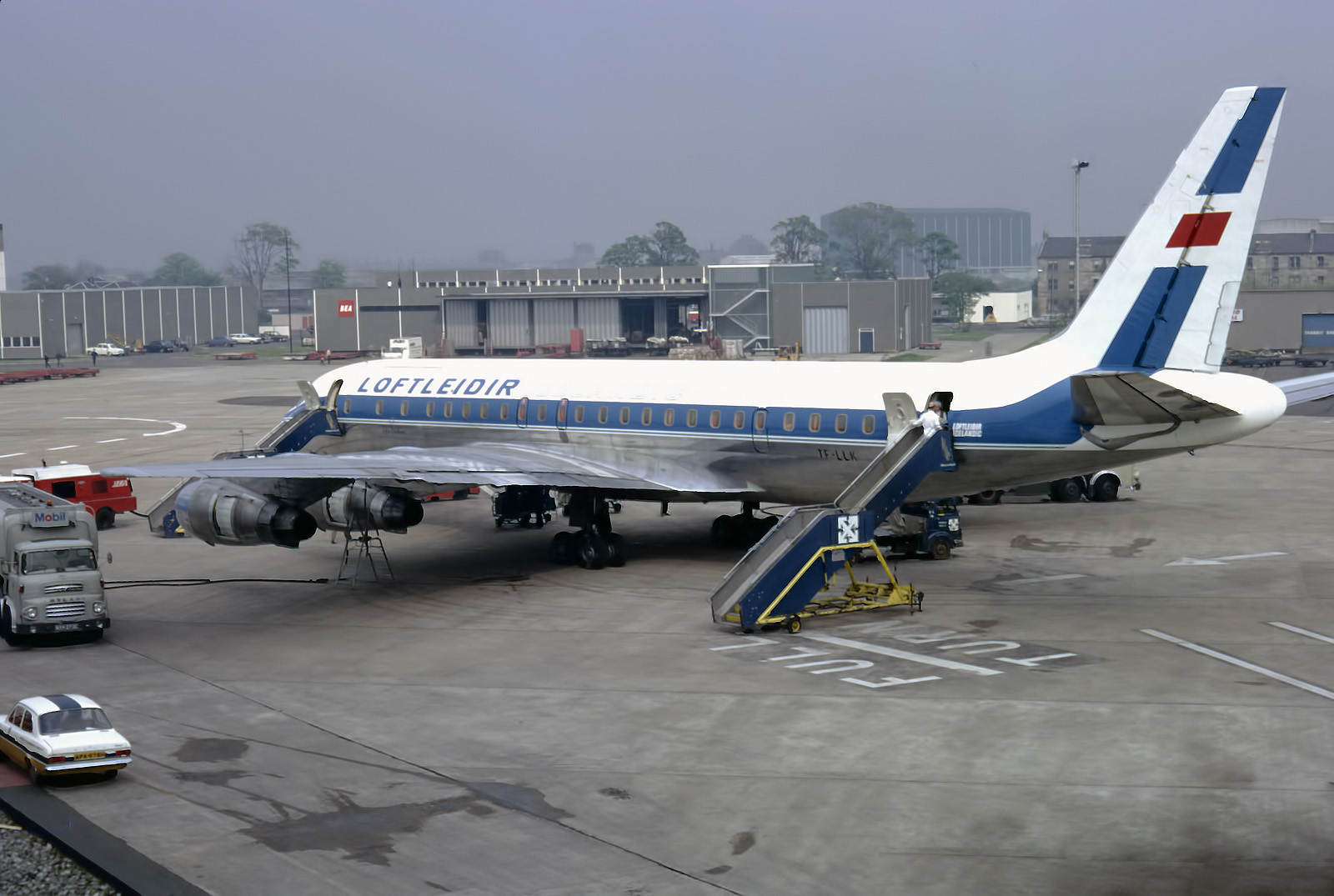
A Loftleiðir Douglas DC-8-55CF at Glasgow Airport in 1972. This aircraft would eventually crash as Martinair Flight 138, in 1974.

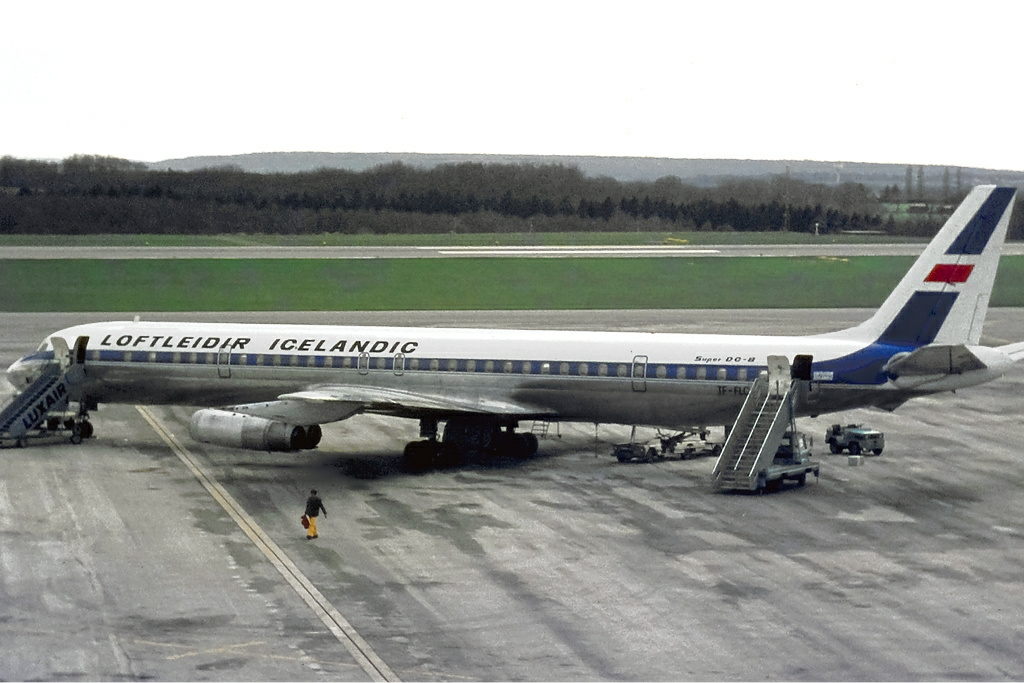
A Loftleiðir Douglas DC-8-63CF at Luxembourg-Findel International Airport in 1978

Aircraft	Introduced	Retired
Avro Anson		
Canadair CL-44	1964	
Douglas DC-3		
Douglas DC-4 / Douglas C-54	1947	
Douglas DC-6	1959	
Douglas DC-8 (including DC-8-55 and Super DC-8-63)	1970	
Grumman Goose	1944	
Noorduyn Norseman		
Stinson Reliant	1944	
Vultee L-1 Vigilant		

== Accidents and incidents ==
- On 13 March 1947, a Loftleiðir Grumman JRF-6B with seven passengers and a pilot crashed immediately after a takeoff on Hvammsfjörður by the town of Búðardalur in Iceland. The pilot and 4 other passengers were rescued by a boat after they got themselves out of the plane. 3 passengers never got out of the plane and went down with it under water. One of the passengers that was rescued did not survive. The pilot and 3 passengers survived. 4 passengers were killed.
- On 14 September 1950, a Loftleiðir Douglas C-54 Skymaster (registered TF-RVC, named Geysir) crashed into the Vatnajökull glacier. Six crew members were on this cargo flight from Luxembourg to Reykjavík (the first service for the airline on that route). All occupants survived, but were not found until 18 September, as the crash site was unknown and search efforts focused elsewhere. The occupants were not rescued until 20 September, due to the difficulty of reaching the location on the glacier.
- On 23 June 1973, a Loftleiðir Douglas DC-8 (registered N8960T) was damaged in a tail-first landing at John F. Kennedy International Airport, when it completed Flight 509 on the Stockholm-Oslo-Reykjavík-New York route with 119 passengers and nine crew members on board. An NTSB investigation found that the accident was caused by a flawed procedure when the spoilers were extended just before touchdown (normally, the spoilers are armed after lowering the landing gear and then extend automatically after touchdown).
- On 15 November 1978, Loftleiðir Flight 001, a Douglas DC-8 (registered TF-FLA), operating for Garuda Indonesia, missed the runway upon approach of Colombo Airport in Sri Lanka during a chartered Hajj pilgrimage flight from Jeddah and crashed. 181 passengers died in the accident, while 74 passengers and 5 crew members survived.

== In popular culture ==
- Alfred Eliasson & Loftleiðir Icelandic is a 2009 documentary film from Iceland, which tells the story of the airline and one of its founders, narrated in Icelandic by Arnar Jónsson.
