= 1947 Héðinsfjörður plane crash =

Icelandic plane crash

1947 Flugfélag Íslands DC-3 crash
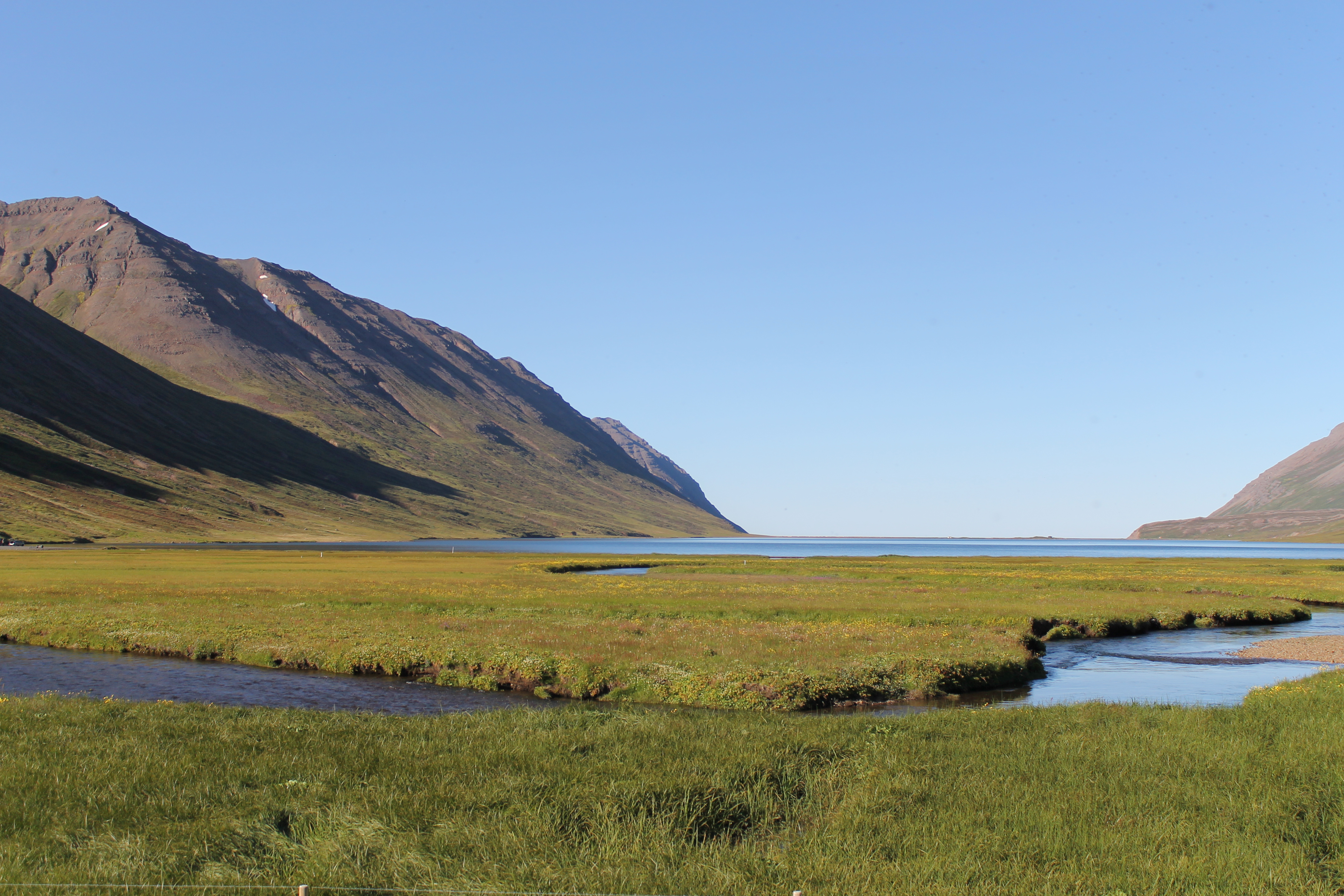
- Héðinsfjörður seen from its headwaters; Hestfjall, on which the DC-3 crashed, is on the left.

Accident
- Date: 29 May 1947
- Summary: Controlled flight into terrain
- Site: Héðinsfjörður in northern Iceland

Aircraft
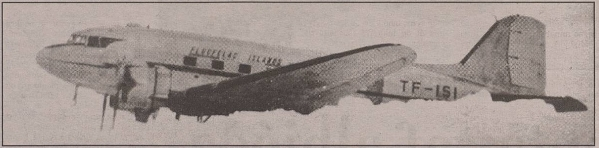
- TF-ISI, the aircraft involved in the accident
- Aircraft type: Douglas DC-3
- Operator: Flugfélag Íslands
- Registration: TF-ISI
- Flight origin: Reykjavík Airport; Reykjavík, Iceland
- Destination: Akureyri Airport; Akureyri, Iceland
- Passengers: 21
- Crew: 4
- Fatalities: 25
- Survivors: 0

On 29 May 1947, a Douglas DC-3 aircraft of Flugfélag Íslands crashed on Hestfjall on the west side of Héðinsfjörður, a fjord in northern Iceland. All 25 people on board were killed. It is the deadliest air accident in Iceland.

== Accident and recovery ==
The aircraft was manufactured in 1944 as a Douglas C-47 Skytrain and later converted to DC-3 standard for civilian use. It was registered as TF-ISI to Flugfélag Íslands, now Air Iceland Connect, the domestic Icelandic airline. It left at 11:25 on a scheduled one and a half hour flight from Reykjavík Airport to the former site of Akureyri Airport. It was heard over Skagafjörður and seen flying low over the water towards Siglunes, the northernmost point between the Siglufjörður and Héðinsfjörður fjords on the northern coast, but failed to arrive. The weather was very foggy and searchers were unable to locate the wreckage until next morning, when it was spotted from one of three search aeroplanes on the side of Hestfjall, the mountain to the west of Héðinsfjörður. The DC-3 had disintegrated, slid down the mountainside, and caught fire. There were no survivors of the four crew and 21 passengers. The pilot was presumed to have been flying visually over the water, as was normal at the time since there were few navigational aids on the route, and to have become aware of the mountain only at the last moment. The accident is estimated to have happened at 12:48.

The bodies were taken by boat to Ólafsfjörður and from there, draped in the Icelandic flag, to Akureyri, where a dockside ceremony on their arrival on the evening of 30 May was attended by a crowd of about 4,000 people, and they were then transported to Akureyrarkirkja.

== Legacy ==
The accident is the deadliest air accident in Iceland and the second deadliest involving an Icelandic aircraft, after the crash of Icelandic Airlines Flight 001 in Sri Lanka in 1978. In 1997, fifty years after the accident, the Súlur Kiwanis Club of Ólafsfjörður erected a memorial below the crash site in the form of a two-metre Celtic cross. A book about the accident, Harmleikur í Héðinsfirði by Margrét Þóra Þórsdóttir, was published in 2009. In 2020, the accident was featured in the fourth episode of the documentary TV series Siglufjörður – saga bæjar on RÚV.
