= Hannes Þór Smárason =

Icelandic executive and entrepreneur

Hannes Smárason
- Born: Iceland
- Education: MIT Sloan School of Management
- Occupation: CEO of WuXi NextCODE
- Website: hannessmarason.com

Hannes Smárason is an Icelandic executive and entrepreneur who served as the executive vice president and senior business and finance officer of deCODE genetics from in late 1900s and the early 2000s and the chairman and CEO of Icelandair and its parent company FL Group in the mid to late 2000s. In October 2013 Hannes co-founded and was named CEO of NextCode Health, a startup formed to apply the massive genomics database developed by deCode Genetics to patient care. Hannes negotiated the sale of NextCode to WuXi AppTech and later became CEO of WuXi NextCode.

== Early career ==
Hannes represented Iceland at a junior level in soccer. He graduated from the Massachusetts Institute of Technology with degrees in Mechanical Engineering and Management and also obtained an MBA from the MIT Sloan School of Management. He worked for McKinsey & Company from 1992 to 1996 in Boston as a consultant.

== deCODE genetics ==
Kári Stefánsson asked Hannes to join him in establishing deCODE in 1996. Hannes served as senior vice president, chief business officer and treasurer, chief financial officer, and executive vice president and senior business and finance officer for deCODE. deCODE made a series of genetic discoveries involving 27 common diseases that were published in top scientific journals. In 1998 Hannes was involved in the $200 million genomics collaboration between Hoffman-La Roche and deCODE to identify genes involved in common diseases which was billed as the largest human genomics deal up to that time. Hannes oversaw deCODE's initial public offering on the NASDAQ stock market in 2000 – the first listing of an Icelandic company on an international exchange. Hannes also oversaw a deal with Hoffman-La Roche to integrate genetics, services and diagnostics in 2001, the acquisition of MediChem Life Sciences in 2002, and a deal in the same year with Merck & Co. to identify genes involved in obesity. He left deCODE in 2004. The company was subsequently sold to Amgen for $415 million with Hannes providing advice to deCODE during the sale process.

== Chairman of Icelandair and FL Group ==
Hannes became chairman and chief executive officer of Icelandair, in 2004. Icelandair changed its name to FL Group in 2005. Hannes oversaw the acquisition of the Danish airline Sterling Airways and the sale of FL Group's 16.18% stake in the British airline EasyJet which returned a profit of US$178 million. In 2006 FL Group sold Icelandair to other Icelandic investors. Under Hannes’ leadership, FL Group purchased a 5.98 percent share in AMR Corp., the parent of American Airlines. Hannes later urged AMR to spin off its frequent flyer program. FL Group shed its stake in AMR in late 2007. Under Hannes, FL Group made charitable contributions such as co-underwriting a 135 million Icelandic Krona contribution to UNICEF to support education in Guinea-Bissau. The group also purchased Refresco, which is now the largest private label soft drink company in Europe, and the House of Fraser, a leading high street retailer in the UK. Hannes left FL Group in 2007.

== Private investor ==
As a private investor, Hannes was part of a group that built the Smáralind shopping center near Reykjavík, Iceland. Smaralind is today Iceland's largest shopping center with over 100 shops, restaurants and services.

== Aftermath of financial crisis ==
In 2010 Hannes was named as one of eight defendants in a suit filed by the winding-up committee of Glitnir Bank. The suit was dismissed in New York in December 2010, refiled in 2011 and dismissed again in January 2012. Hannes filed suit for reimbursement of legal expenses from the winding up committee.

According to a report by the Icelandic Public Radio, (RUV), Hannes’ business dealings were the subject of investigation by the Icelandic authorities, culminating with a charge for misappropriation in November 2013. He was acquitted in Reykjavik District Court in February 2015. The Supreme Court of Iceland confirmed the acquittal in October 2016.

== Co-founder, COO and CEO of WuXi NextCode ==
In October 2013 Hannes co-founded and became CEO of NextCode Health, a spinout of deCODE with a mission of applying deCODE's genomic database to patient care. In January 2015, WuXi AppTech acquired NextCode Health for $65 million and merged NextCode with its genome center to form a new company called WuXi NextCode. Hannes became Co-Founder and COO of the new company. In 2016, WuXi NextCode introduced three products – RareCODE, FamilyCODE and HealthCODE—tailored to Chinese population variants. In January 2017 WuXi NextCode, AbbVie and Genomics Medicine Ireland launched an initiative to sequence 45,000 volunteer participants from across Ireland to advance the clinical development of better treatments for a range of serious diseases. WuXi NextCode appointed Hannes as CEO in February 2017. WuXi NextCode closed a $240 million Series B round of financing in September 2017. The company grew from 60 to just under 500 people by the end of 2017. In March 2018 Hannes stepped down as CEO and transitioned to a position as Co-Founder and Senior Advisor to WuXi NextCode.
