= Air Iceland Connect =

Regional airline of Iceland

IATA	ICAO	Call sign
NY	FXI	FAXI
- Founded: June 3, 1937 (as Flugfélag Akureyrar)
- AOC #: IS-003
- Hubs: Reykjavík Airport
- Frequent-flyer program: Icelandair Saga Club
- Fleet size: 6
- Destinations: 15
- Parent company: Icelandair Group
- Traded as: Icelandair
- Headquarters: Reykjavík Airport; Reykjavík, Iceland
- Key people: Árni Gunnarsson
- Website: airicelandconnect.is

Air Iceland Connect, formerly Air Iceland (Icelandic: Flugfélag Íslands, pronounced [ˈflʏːɣˌfjɛːˌlaːɣ ˈistlan(t)s]) is a regional airline, wholly owned by the Icelandair Group, operating all of Icelandair's Dash-8 aircraft under the Flugfélag Íslands Air Operator's Certificate, using the brand name Icelandair.

Prior to 2021, Air Iceland Connect was operated as a separate brand and airline.

== History ==
Air Iceland Connect can trace its history to 1937. On 3 June that year, Flugfélag Akureyrar was established; the airline changed its name to Flugfélag Íslands on 13 March 1940, the third airline to bear this name. The first Flugfélag Íslands was founded on 22 March 1919 and dissolved the following year. A second airline of the same name was founded on 1 May 1928 and operated until 1931. In 1973, Flugfélag Íslands and Loftleiðir merged under the name Flugleiðir. Domestically it was called Flugleiðir, while internationally it was branded as Icelandair.

In Akureyri, Tryggvi Helgason founded the airline Norðurflug; it was incorporated on 1 May 1995 as Flugfélag Norðurlands. Subsequently, in 1997, Flugfélag Norðurlands merged with Flugleiðir's domestic operations under the previously used name Flugfélag Íslands, branded as Air Iceland in English.

In 2000, Air Iceland's fleet consisted of three Fokker 50 aircraft which were acquired by Flugleiðir in 1992 and Fairchild Swearingen Metroliner in 1991, as well as De Havilland Canada DHC-6 Twin Otter aircraft transferred from Flugfélag Norðurlands. In 2001, a fourth Fokker 50 was added to the fleet. At the time, its network consisted of flights from Reykjavík Airport to Akueyri, Egilsstaðir, Höfn, Ísafjörður, Vestmanneyjar, Vágar, Kulusuk and Narsarsuaq as well as routes from Akureyri Airport to Grímsey, Vopnafjörður and Þórshöfn.

The airline previously operated ATR 42 aircraft, wet leased from Íslandsflug, from 2000 to 2003.

In 1995, then as Flugleiðir, the airline entered a partnership with Atlantic Airways of the Faroe Islands to supplement capacity on the Route Vágar-Reykjavík-Narsarsuaq using BAe 146 aircraft. In 2004, Air Iceland ceased operating their own flights to Vágar in the Faroe Islands but continued to sell seats in cooperation with Atlantic Airways.

=== Fleet renewal and international network ===
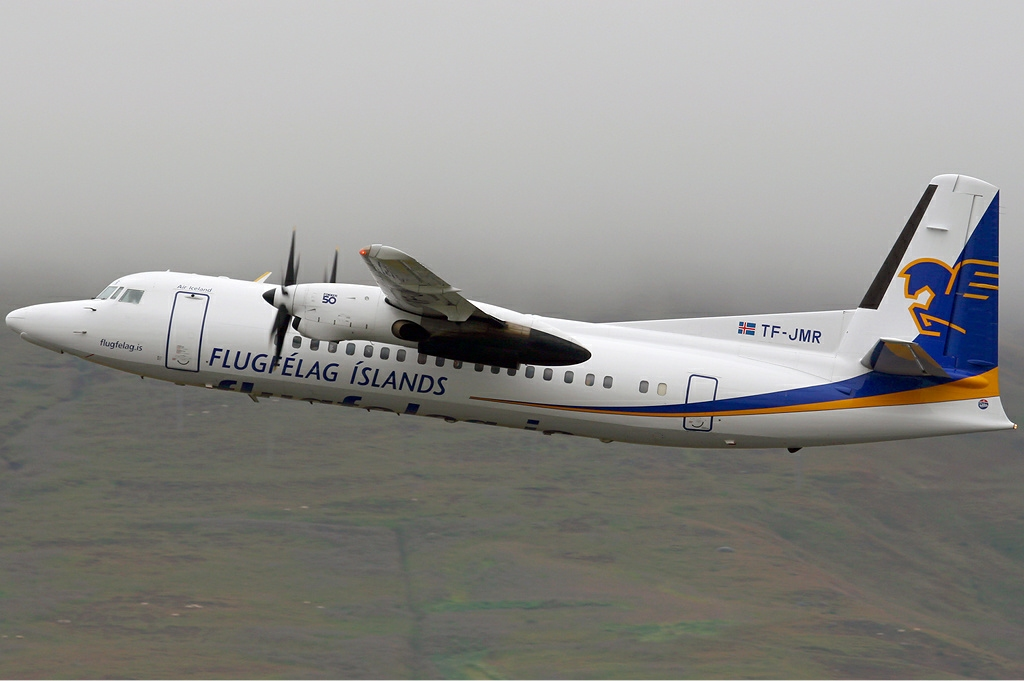
Fokker 50, operated by Flugfélag Íslands from 1992 to 2015

In 2006, Flugfélag Íslands introduced two Dash 8-100 aircraft into its fleet, replacing three Metroliner aircraft which were sold the same year. In 2006, the fleet consisted of six Fokker 50, two Dash 8-100 and two De Havilland Canada DHC-6 Twin Otter aircraft.

In 2008, the airline sold off its two De Havilland Canada DHC-6 Twin Otter aircraft to Norlandair, who also acquired the associated routes.

Air Iceland has served Kulusuk, Narsarsuaq and Constable Point since its establishment (and earlier as Flugleiðir). In 2007, Air Iceland expanded its Greenland network by introducing direct flights from Keflavík to Nuuk in Greenland, followed by Ilulissat the following year enabled by their newly acquired Dash 8 aircraft. In 2010, routes to Kulusuk, Nuuk and Constable Point became served year-round. Norlandair later acquired the route to Constable Point (Nerlerit Inaat). In 2016 and 2017, Air Iceland operated a route to Kangerlussuaq seasonally over the summer.

In late 2011, Flugfélag Íslands acquired two Dash 8-200 aircraft for delivery in early 2012. Upon delivery of these aircraft, the airline sold its remaining Dash 8–100 series aircraft (the other was written off). A fleet of three Dash 8-400 aircraft replaced the airline's five Fokker 50 aircraft in 2015–16.

=== Increased international service ===
Services using the new aircraft included routes to Aberdeen which started in March 2016, and Belfast which began in June 2017, both flown out of Keflavík International Airport.

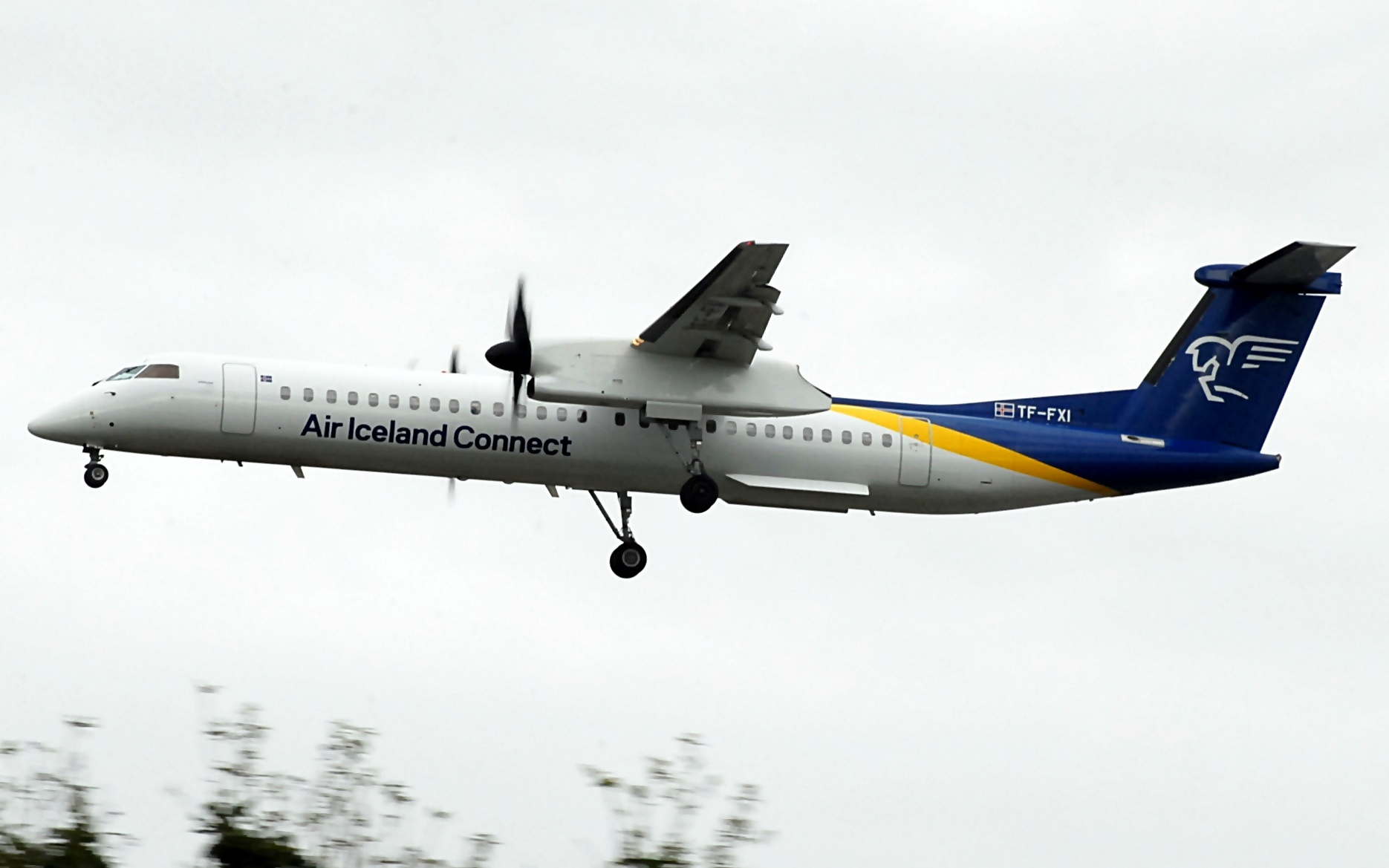
Air Iceland Connect branded Dash 8-400

In May 2017, Flugfélag Íslands announced it had rebranded as Air Iceland Connect. Árni Gunnarsson, managing director of Air Iceland Connect, stated that the name change would help distinguish themselves from Icelandair and signify the airline's connection to Icelandic and international destinations. Dropping the Icelandic name resulted in complaints about the attack on the Icelandic language.

In February 2018, Air Iceland Connect announced a strategy change by focusing on regional destinations. Therefore, flights to the Aberdeen and Belfast had been cut by 14 May 2018. In conjunction, one Dash 8-400 was sold.

In 2023, a De Havilland Canada Dash 8-400 aircraft was added to the fleet, bringing the total number of Dash 8-400 aircraft to three again.

=== Discontinuation of brand ===
On 9 March 2021, Icelandair Group announced that Air Iceland Connect is to merge its sales operations with Icelandair by uniting domestic and international brands from 16 March 2021 and continuing the current flight operations under the Icelandair brand. The company Air Iceland Connect continues to operate domestic flights under its own Air Operator's Certificate and legal responsibility but using the Icelandair brand.

== Destinations ==
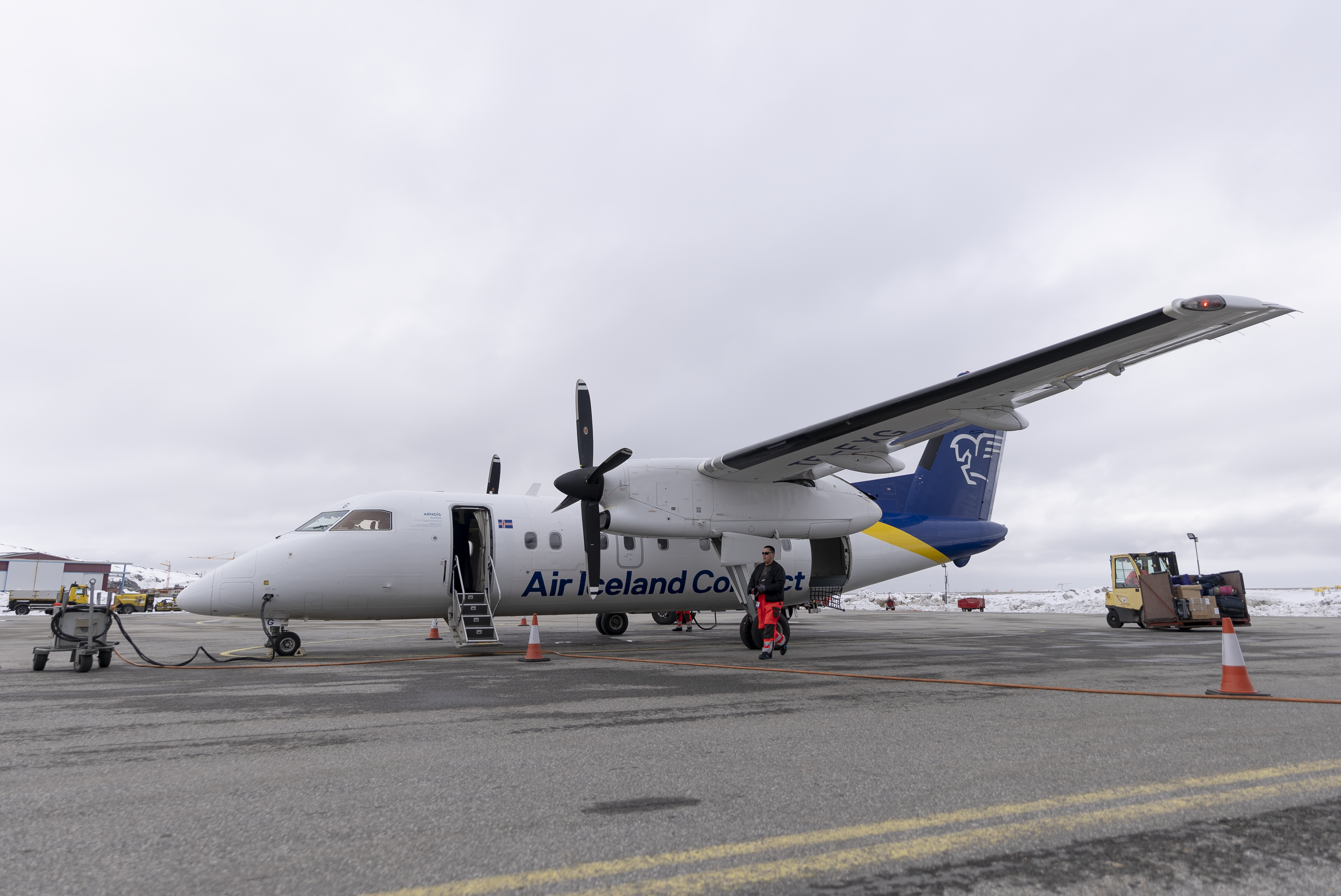
Air Iceland Connect Dash 8–200 at Nuuk Airport

Air Iceland Connect operated to the following destinations under its own name, before the brand was integrated with Icelandair in March 2021.

Country	City	Airport	Notes
Greenland	Ilulissat	Ilulissat Airport	Seasonal
Greenland	Kangerlussuaq	Kangerlussuaq Airport	Terminated
Greenland	Kulusuk	Kulusuk Airport	
Greenland	Narsarsuaq	Narsarsuaq Airport	Seasonal
Greenland	Nerlerit Inaat	Nerlerit Inaat Airport	Terminated
Greenland	Nuuk	Nuuk Airport	
Iceland	Akureyri	Akureyri Airport	
Iceland	Egilsstaðir	Egilsstaðir Airport	
Iceland	Grímsey	Grímsey Airport	Terminated
Iceland	Húsavík	Húsavík Airport	Terminated
Iceland	Höfn	Hornafjörður Airport	Terminated
Iceland	Ísafjörður	Ísafjörður Airport	
Iceland	Raufarhöfn	Raufarhöfn Airport	Terminated
Iceland	Reykjavík	Keflavík International Airport	
Iceland	Reykjavík	Reykjavík Airport	Base
Iceland	Vestmannaeyjar	Vestmannaeyjar Airport	Terminated
Iceland	Vopnafjörður	Vopnafjörður Airport	Terminated
Iceland	Þórshöfn	Þórshöfn Airport	Terminated
United Kingdom	Aberdeen	Aberdeen Airport	Terminated
United Kingdom	Belfast	George Best Belfast City Airport	Terminated

=== Codeshare agreements ===
Air Iceland Connect had codeshare agreements on flights to the Faroe Islands operated by Atlantic Airways, as well as on services to Grímsey, Thorshofn, Vopnafjörður and Nerlerit Inaat Airport operated by Norlandair.

== Fleet ==
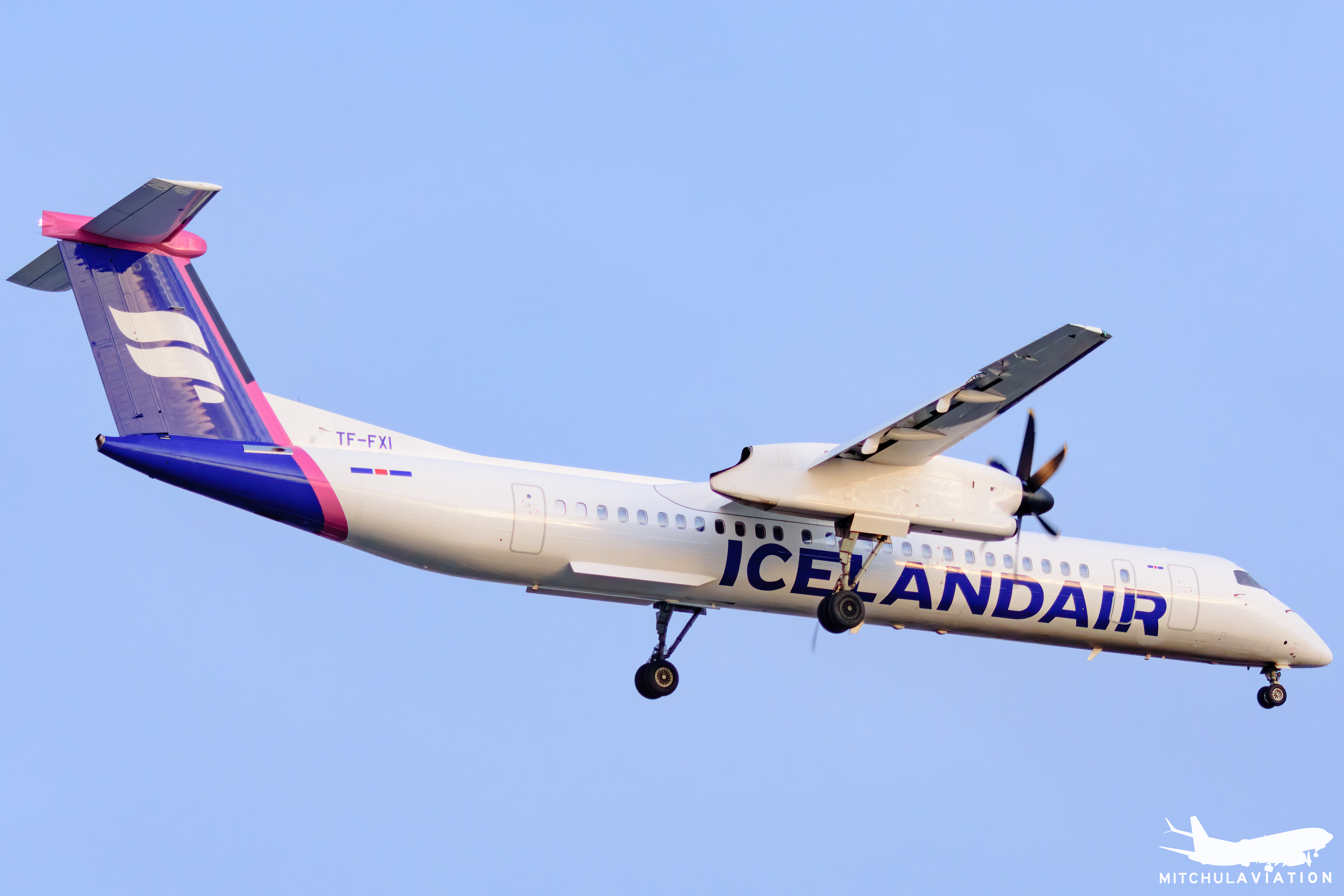
Flugfélag Íslands Dash 8–400 in Icelandair livery

As of July 2026, Air Iceland Connect operates the following aircraft:

Air Iceland Connect fleet
Aircraft	In service	Orders	Passengers	Notes
De Havilland Canada Dash 8-200	3	—	37	In Icelandair livery.
De Havilland Canada Dash 8-400	3	—	74	In Icelandair livery.
Total	6	—		

Among the destinations, most in Greenland and some in Iceland have runways less than 1,100 metres (3,600 ft) in length. The Q200 is the only aircraft type possessed by Air Iceland Connect compatible with such runways. Its retired fleet includes Fokker 50s.

== Accidents and incidents ==
- On 14 April 1942, Flugfélag Íslands Smyrill crashed shortly after takeoff from Reykjavík Airport, killing merchant and former athlete Axel Kristjánsson and an officer from the British occupation force in Iceland, while injuring two others.
- On 29 May 1947, a Flugfélag Íslands Douglas DC-3 with registration TF-ISI crashed at Héðinsfjörður, Iceland, in bad weather, killing all 25 on board. As of 2018 this is the worst aircraft accident to occur in Iceland.
- On 26 September 1970, Flugfélag Íslands Flight 704, a Fokker F27 Friendship with registration TF-FIL, crashed into the mountains of Mykines in the Faroe Islands, in heavy fog, killing the Icelandic captain and 7 Faroese passengers. 26 passenger and crew survived the crash. Three passengers, who escaped with minor injuries, hiked for an hour down the mountain to the village of Mykines, alerting authorities. The majority of the villagers went up the mountain to aid the injured.
- On 18 June 1980, Flugleiðir's Fokker F27 Friendship, with 19 people on board, made an emergency landing on Keflavík Airport after its landing gear failed to come down on its approach to Vestmannaeyjar. The pilots managed to lower two of the plane's three landing gears and successfully land the plane in Keflavík with minimal damage to the plane.
- On 20 March 1982, the left engine of Flugleiðir's Fokker F27 Friendship, with registration TL-FLM, blew up during takeoff from Ísafjörður Airport, at the altitude of 490 feet. The pilots managed to put out the fire but could not lower the left landing gear due to the damage it sustained in the explosion. Instead of trying to land on the narrow Ísafjörður airport with only two wheels down, the captain decided to fly about 230 km to the much larger Keflavík Airport to attempt an emergency landing there. Despite the front part of the engine almost breaking of in the explosion, the plane managed to land in Keflavík with minimal additional damage to the plane. All 25 people on board survived without injuries.
- On 11 March 1986, the pilots of a Flugleiðir Fokker F27 Friendship, with registration TL-FLO, aborted takeoff from Reykjavík Airport after hearing unusual noise coming from the plane but were unable to stop it before it reached the end of the runway due to wet conditions. The plane went off the end of the runway, hit a concrete ditch which resulted in the front landing gear breaking off, went through a fence at the edge of the runway and came to a halt on the middle of the Suðurgata, a busy traffic street, barely missing a large oil truck that had just passed by. All 45 people on board escaped without injuries.
- On 8 July 1986, a privately owned single engine Socata Rallye Tampico crashed during takeoff from Reykjavík Airport, slid into Flugleiðir's Fokker F27 Friendship, with registration TF-FLM, and caught fire. The Fokker was deboarding at the time and a stewardess managed to push three passengers out of the way just before the Tampico hit. The flight engineer of the Fokker had grabbed a fire extinguisher when he saw the plane crash and managed to contain the fire before another employee of Flugleiðir came with a second extinguisher and helped him put the fire out before it could reach the fuel gushing out of the damaged airplane. All four people on board the small plane were pulled out with minor injuries.
- On 4 March 2011, a De Havilland Canada Dash 8-100 registered TF-JMB was hit by a microburst while landing at Nuuk Airport in Greenland. It touched down hard and the right main landing gear collapsed. The aircraft veered off the runway, tearing the nose landing gear off. The 31 people on board were unharmed, however, the aircraft was written off.
