= Stodir =

Icelandic financial services company

- Type: Private
- Industry: Investment
- Founded: 1973; 53 years ago
- Headquarters: Reykjavík, Iceland
- Key people: Jón Sigurðsson (CEO), Júlíus Þorfinnsson (COO)
- Net income: (ISK 19.9 billion) (2021)
- Total assets: (ISK 51.1 billion) (2021)
- Number of employees: 6
- Website: stodir.is

Stodir (Icelandic: Stoðir; FL Group prior to 4 June 2008) is a majority family-owned investment company located in Reykjavík, Iceland. The company was founded on July 20, 1973, under the name Flugleiðir. It was formed as a holding company for Loftleiðir and Air Iceland.

FL Group was best known for its subsidiary Icelandair Group, which was sold in October 2006. Icelandair, Loftleidir Icelandic and other companies of Icelandair Group have been leaders in the Icelandic flight and tourism industry for about 70 years.

The company was placed into administration in September 2008 after Glitnir, its largest investment, was part-nationalised by the Icelandic government.

The company, then named Stodir, was restructured in 2009 and all shares delivered to its creditors. Between 2009 and 2016, all assets were sold and all debt repaid. In 2017, new shareholders acquired the company and Stodir was repositioned as an active investment company.

== History ==
=== Before 2005 change ===
The company that is nowadays called Stodir was founded in 1973. In the beginning it was a holding company for "Loftleiðir" and Air Iceland under the name Flugleidir, a hybrid of the two old names. In 1978 Flugleidir took over all assets of both companies. Until then "Loftleidir" had used "Loftleidir Icelandic", "Icelandic Airlines" or just "Icelandic" for international marketing and Air Iceland used "Icelandair". That same year the name "Icelandair" was to be used solely for international marketing. Flugleiðir was still the official name of the company until 2005.

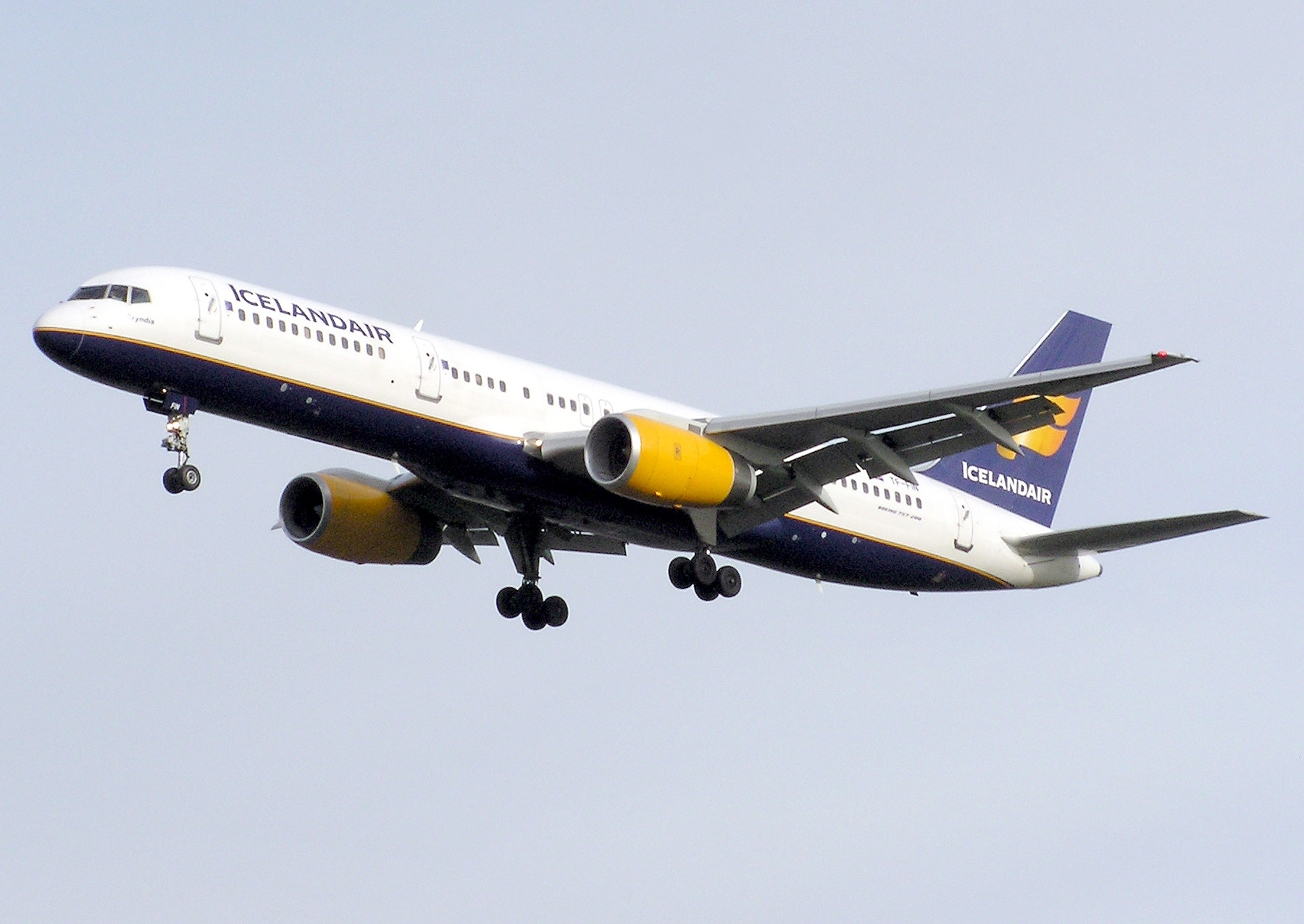
Icelandair Boeing 757-200

In December 2002 Baugur Group acquired 20% of the company. Baugur Group was reportedly controlled by a number of companies using a single mailbox in the British Virgin Islands.

Logo of FL Group before the name change

=== 2005 change ===
In 2005, the company known as Flugleiðir was changed to an investment company called FL GROUP. The airline had been spun off into a subsidiary named Icelandair in 2002. On October 23, 2005 FL GROUP announced its acquisition of the Danish low-cost airline Sterling Airways. In addition, FL GROUP holds a 16.18% stake in British "no-frills" carrier easyJet. On January 6, 2006, Hannes Smárason, CEO, stated that a merger of easyJet and Sterling was a possibility.

=== 2006-2007 ===
In early 2006 Ferðaskrifstofa Íslands was sold to Sumarferðir and Icelandair Car Rental (Hertz) was sold to Magnús Kristinsson, the owner of Toyota in Iceland.

In February 2006 FL GROUP announced plans to list its subsidiary Icelandair Group in Iceland Stock Exchange.

FL sold its 16.9% stake in airline easyJet in April 2006 for €325m, returning a profit of €140m on its investment. FL had first invested in easyJet in October 2004, taking an 8.4% share, increasing this over the course of 2005.

In October 2006 FL GROUP secured the sale of Icelandair Group.

In 2007, the FL Group invested $50 million in several Bayrock projects linked to Donald Trump, including a development in Whitestone, Queens, and Trump SoHo in Manhattan.

=== 2008 revamp ===
In February 2008, after the US real-estate bubble had burst, FL Group announced it was divesting itself of its real-estate projects in the US. The Trump Tower project, along with other US based real estate projects, were moved to a subsidiary of FL Group called FL Bayrock Holdco. In March, stakes in Finnair and investment group Aktiv Kapital were divested; in April a 39% stake in FL was acquired by Styrkur Invest, a company controlled by FL's Chairman Jón Ásgeir Jóhannesson. The company then delisted from the Iceland Stock Exchange on 6 June after a share buyback. Jón Ásgeir stepped down as Chairman later that month after a conviction for breaking accounting laws. His wife Ingibjorg Stefania Palmadottir was elected as his replacement. On July 4, FL Group announced both that it had changed its name to Stodir and acquired a 39% stake in retail holding company Baugur Group.

=== Insolvency 2008 ===
In September 2008 Stodir filed an application for a debt moratorium process at the District Court of Reykjavík, effectively putting the company into administration. The move was prompted by the Government of Iceland's acquisition of three-quarters of troubled bank Glitnir, in which Stodir had previously held a 32% stake. For 2008, FL Bayrock Holdco posted more than US$140 million in losses. It was declared bankrupt in January 2014, costing its sole investor and creditor, the parent FL Group, nearly US$130 million in losses.

=== 2009-2016 ===
Composition agreement reached with creditors (June 2009), which thereby acquired all shares in the renamed company Stodir. Between 2009 and 2016, all assets were sold except for a shareholding in Refresco Holding, a pan European beverage company, all debt was paid off, and all legal issues resolved.

=== 2017 ===
S121 ehf. (a group of Icelandic and UK family investors) acquired the majority of shares in Stodir.

=== 2018 ===
Refresco shareholding was sold for EUR 140 million and Stodir was repositioned as an active investment company.

=== Since 2018 ===
A number of investments made, including listed shares in Arion bank, Siminn, Kvika bank and Blue Lagoon.

== Investments ==
As of August 2023:

- Arion Bank, an Icelandic bank (5% holding)
- Síminn, an Icelandic telecommunications firm (16% holding)
- Kvika bank, an Icelandic bank (6% holding)

== Management ==
=== Board of directors ===
- Sigurjón Pálsson, Executive Chairman
- Ari Fenger
- Magnús Ármann

=== Key employees ===
- Jón Sigurðsson, CEO
- Júlíus Þorfinnsson, COO
- Lárus Welding, CFO
