= Skerjafjörður =

Fjord in western Iceland

Coordinates: 64°07′30″N 21°58′30″W

Skerjafjörður (Icelandic pronunciation: [ˈscɛrjaˌfjœrðʏr̥], "skerry fjord") is a fjord located immediately west of Iceland's capital Reykjavík. It is part of a larger bay, Faxaflói, on Iceland's west coast.

On 7 August 2000, a plane crashed into the sea in Skerjafjörður. All 6 people on board the plane died.

On 1 March 2026, former Prime Minister of Iceland Davíð Oddsson, died at his home in Skerjafjörður at the age of 78.
