= List of defunct airlines of Iceland =

This is a list of now defunct airlines of Iceland.

Airline	Image	IATA	ICAO	Callsign	Commenced operations	Ceased operations	Notes
A
Air Arctic					2012	2014	Operated Cessna Golden Eagle
Air Arctic Iceland				ARCTIC AIR	1985	1986	
Air Iceland; Flugfélag Íslands		NY	FXI	FAXI	1997	2017	Merged into Air Iceland Connect
Air Iceland Connect		NY	FXI		2017	2021	To Icelandair. Operated Bombardier Q200, Bombardier Q400
Air Viking		VV			1969	1976	Operated Boeing 720, Convair 880, Vickers Vanguard
AirXport					1986	1989	
Arnarflug					1976	1991	Renamed to Eagle Air Iceland. Operated Boeing 707, Boeing 737, DHC-6 Twin Otter, Piper Navajo
Atlanta Icelandic Air Transport		CC	ABD	TEMPAIR	1986	1992	Renamed/merged to Air Atlanta Icelandic
Atlantic Island Air		ID	TRG	ATLANTSFLUG	1990	1992	
B
Bluebird Cargo		BF	BBD		1999	2017	Rebranded as Bluebird Nordic
Bluebird Nordic		BO	BBD	BLUE CARGO	2017	2024	
E
Eagle Air (Iceland)			FEI	ARCTIC EAGLE	1970	2024	
Eagle Air Cargo					1976	1986	Operated Boeing 707
Eagle Air Domestic					1990	1991	Merged with Flugtak to form Íslandsflug
Eastair			EGX		2000	2000	Established as Flugfélag Austurlands in 1972
Eyjaflug					1965	1966	Operated de Havilland Dove
F
Flufelagid Ernir					1978	1979	Established as Hordur Gudmundsson Air Service in 1969
Flugfélag Akureyrar					1937	1940	Rebranded as Flugfélag Íslands. Operated Waco YKS-7
Flugfélag Austurlands		EZ	EGX		1972	2000	Renamed to Eastair
Flugfélag Innanlands					1995	1997	Merged with Flugfélag Norðurlands
Flugfélag Íslands				ICELAND AW	1940	1973	Merged with Loftleiðir to form Icelandair
Flugfélag Norðurlands		UI	FNA	NORLAND	1959	1997	
Flugfélag Vestmannaeyja			FVM	ELEGANT	1983	2010	
Flugferdir					1962	1965	Renamed to Flugstoedin. Operated Airspeed Consul
Flugjonustan					1954	1969	Operated Cessna Skywagon, de Havilland Dove, Twin Pioneer, Twin Bonanza
Flughjalp					1969	1970	Operated Douglas C-118 in Biafra
Flugsyn					1960	1975	Operated Cessna Skywagon, Cessna 150, Piper Cherokee, Douglas DC-3
Flugtak					1990	1991	Merged with Eagle Air Domestic to form Íslandsflug
Flugtaxi					2004	2006	
Fragtflug Iceland					1970	1972	
G
Greenland Express					2013	2016	Virtual airline renamed Sky Greenland
H
Helgi Jonsson Air Taxi		5H			1964	1989	Renamed to Odin Air
Hordur Gudmundsson Air Service					1969	1970	Renamed to Flugfélagið Ernir
I
Icebird Airlines					1969	1970	Acquired by Air Atlanta Icelandic
Icejet			ICJ	ICEJET	2006	2010	
Iceland Airways					1946	1957	Renamed to Icelandair
Iceland Express		HC		FLY STAR	2003	2012	Merged into WOW air
Iscargo		IU			1973	1980	Went bankrupt. Operated Douglas DC-6
Íslandsflug		HH	ICB	ICEBIRD	1991	2004	Merged into Air Atlanta Icelandic
J
JetX		GX	JXX		2003	2008	Rebranded as Primera Air
Landsflug		X9	ISL	ISLANDIA	2003	2008	
L
Loftleiðir		LL			1944	1975	Merged with Flugfélag Islands to form Icelandair
M
MD Airlines		W3	MDI	DELTA ICE	2000	2003	Operated MD-83
MK Flugfelagid			MKI		1997	2000	Renamed to MD Airlines. Operated Douglas DC-8
Mýflug			MYA	MYFLUG	1985	2025	
N
NAT-Nittler Air Transport International					1969	1970	
Norðurlands					1959	1975	Rebranded Flugfélag Norðurlands
O
Odin Air	Odin_Air_AIR_TO_AIR	5H	ODI	ODINN	1989	1998	Established as Helgi Jonsson Air Taxi. Operated Handley Page Jetstream, Piper Navajo
P
Play		OG	FPY	PLAYER	2019	2025	Went bankrupt.
Primera Air		GX	JXX		2008	2009	Established as JetX
S
Sky Greenland			DNM	DENIM	2013	2016	Virtual airline
T
Thor Air Cargo					1971	1972	Founded by Thor Kjartansson. Operated Vickers Vanguard
V
Vaengir					1950	1979	Operated BN-2 Islander
W
WOW air		WW	WOW	WOW AIR	2012	2019	Went bankrupt

== See also ==
- List of airlines of Iceland
- List of airports in Iceland
