= FVM =

FVM may refer to:

- Finite volume method
- Five Mile Airport, in Alaska, United States
- Flugfélag Vestmannaeyja, a defunct Icelandic airline
- Middle Rhine Football Association (German: Fußball-Verband Mittelrhein)
