= Charles Joy (engineer) =

British aeronautical engineer and designer

Charles Frederick Joy (13 September 1911 – 12 April 1989) FRAeS was a British aeronautical engineer and designer.

== Early life ==
He was the elder son of William J. Joy. He attended Ramsey Abbey Grammar School, where he played in the school cricket team. He came third in the school high jump competition., and also played in the school football team, scoring goals. He won a prize for science in 1928.

His brother Jack William Joy (born c.1912) gained a Huntingdonshire County Scholarship to the grammar school in June 1924, who took part, and won, school athletics competitions, winning the high jump and long jump in 1927 and the high jump in 1929. His brother was also in the school cricket team. His sister also went to the grammar school.

His family attended the local Wesleyan Methodist church, where his brother sang in the choir. His father, brother and sister Betty took part in the life of the local Methodist church at Ramsey St Mary's, but Charles did not.

On Wednesday 12 April 1939 at around 8.30am, his brother, driving a Riley car on St Mary Road, knocked down a cyclist, seven-year-old Colin Darlow, who later died of his injuries, after being attended to by Dr John Popplewell. Jack lived on Biggin Lane.

His sister married Edward Ralph Woodward on 7 August 1939 at Ramsey.

== Career ==
He started at Armstrong Whitworth Aircraft in 1927, staying until 1940. When at Coventry, aged 18 in 1930, he studied at the technical college.

From 1940 to 1941 he was at the Gloster Aircraft Company. On Saturday 4 April 1942 he attended Gloucester County Police Court, where he was fined £1 and 10s, with 10s costs, for showing a light, during the blackout. At the time he lived at 260 Cheltenham Road in Longlevens.

=== Handley Page ===
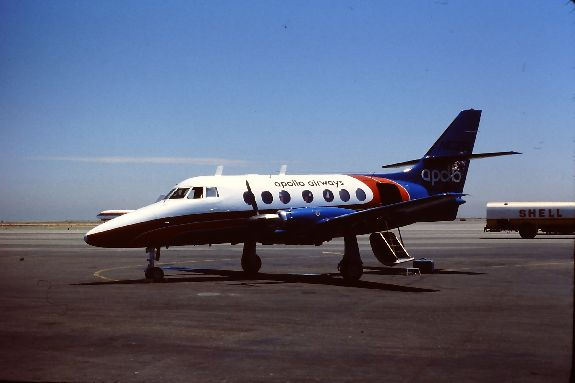
Handley Page Jetstream in 1979

He joined Handley Page in 1944 as Deputy Chief Draughtsman, becoming assistant chief designer in 1947.

He became chief designer at Handley Page Aircraft in 1953, when Reginald Stafford was technical director.

He also had been deputy managing director at Handley Page, from February 1968. Godfrey Lee became chief designer, and Reginald Stafford left the company when technical director.

When the Victor aircraft was being developed, he was the assistant chief designer.

In the 1950s he lived on Eastcote Road in Pinner. Frank Whittle lived at 'Cote Roid' on Cuckoo Hill Road in Pinner, in the early 1950s.

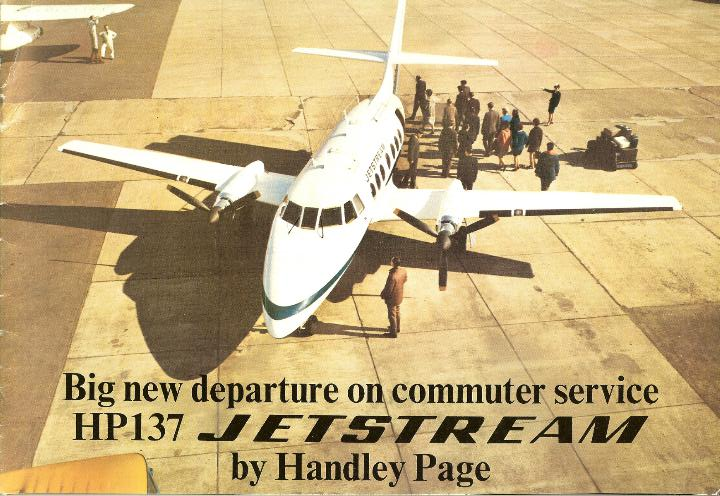
Brochure in 1968 for the Jetstream, designed by Charles Joy

=== Jetstream ===
As chief designer, he was responsible for the Handley Page Jetstream, which first flew on 18 August 1967 at Radlett in Hertfordshire. It was planned to produce around 10 Jetstreams a month. Over 400 Jetstream 31 aircraft would be sold, 161 of the Super 41 were sold and 104 of the British Aerospace Jetstream 41. Jetstreams were made at Prestwick in Scotland. Twenty six Jetstream 201 aircraft served with the RAF, as multi-engine trainers, until March 2004 when replaced by the Super King Air 200.

The Jetstream is the UK's third-most successful airliner. It was cancelled in May 1997 when known as the British Aerospace Jetstream 41, due to it entering a sector for larger type of airliners, with commercially well-established competition. The last one was built in May 1998.

He left Handley Page on 26 November 1969, after the company was bought from the receiver. He was the chief designer until January 1968.

=== Awards ===
He received the RAeS Silver Medal in 1967.

== Personal life ==
He married Winifred Downes on Saturday 11 July 1936 at Warwick Road Congregational Church in Coventry, by Rev. Maurice Watts. Winifred was the second daughter of Richard John Downes, of 10 Bray's Lane.

They had a son in 1939. He died in the Wycombe District on 12 April 1989.

Business positions
Preceded by Reginald Stafford	Chief Designer of Handley Page; 1953 - January 1968	Succeeded by Godfrey Lee (engineer)
