= Play (airline) =

Icelandic low-cost airline (2019–2025)

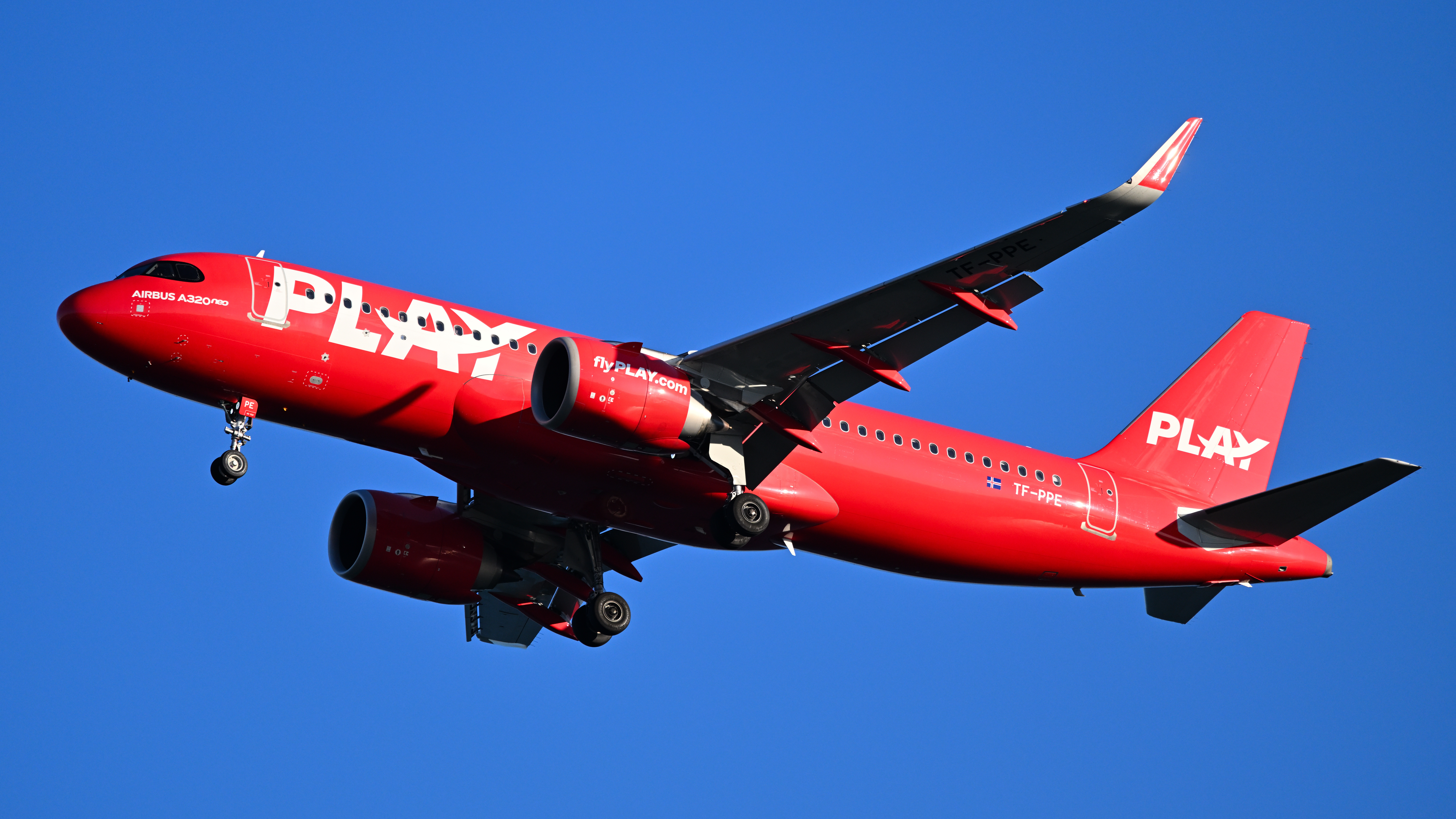
- A Play Airbus A320neo in 2024
IATA	ICAO	Call sign
OG	FPY	PLAYER
- Founded: July 2019; 7 years ago
- Commenced operations: 24 June 2021; 5 years ago
- Ceased operations: 29 September 2025; 10 months ago
- AOC #: IS-043 (Iceland); MT-85 (Malta)
- Hubs: Keflavík International Airport
- Subsidiaries: Play Europe
- Fleet size: 10 (including subsidiary)
- Destinations: 34
- Traded as: Nasdaq Iceland: PLAY
- Headquarters: Reykjavík, Iceland
- Key people: Einar Örn Ólafsson (CEO); Andri Geir Eyjólfsson (COO); Arnar Már Magnússon (co-founder); Sveinn Ingi Steinþórsson (co-founder)
- Employees: 572 (July 2024)
- Website: flyplay.com at the Wayback Machine (archived 29 September 2025)

Fly Play hf., doing business as PLAY, was an Icelandic low-cost airline headquartered in the country's capital of Reykjavík. It operated a fleet of Airbus A320neo family aircraft with its hub at Keflavík International Airport.

== History ==
=== Foundation ===
In July 2019, two former Wow Air executives, Arnar Már Magnússon and Sveinn Ingi Steinþórsson, announced the formation of a new airline, tentatively named WAB air ("We Are Back"). Avianta Capital, an Irish investment fund owned by Aislinn Whittley-Ryan (niece of Ryanair co-founder Tony Ryan), held a 75% stake; the remainder was held by Neo, a company founded by Arnar Már and Sveinn Ingi. The company aimed to operate six aircraft to 14 destinations across Europe and the United States, with a target of one million passengers in the first year. The new company applied for an air operator's certificate (AOC) from the Icelandic Transport Authority.

In November 2019, WAB air rebranded as PLAY, and the hiring of operating staff was initiated. The airline announced that it would lease Airbus A321s configured with 200 passenger seats and would start flights with two aircraft to six European destinations in the winter of 2019–2020. The airline's livery was also planned to be red. By late 2019, Play planned to initially serve six destinations in Europe: Alicante, Tenerife, London, Paris, Copenhagen and Berlin. There were plans to introduce flights to four North American destinations in the spring of 2020. Play originally planned to start operations with two Airbus A321 aircraft configured for 200 passenger seats and add four more aircraft by the summer of 2020. By November 2020, the company had received a landing permit for only three airports: Gatwick, Stansted and Dublin.

In April 2021, it was announced that Play had completed a pre-IPO private placement round with a total transaction size of six billion Icelandic króna (U.S. $47 million) in new equity managed by Arctica Finance. Participating investors included Icelandic investment company Stodir and two Icelandic pension funds. It was also confirmed that Birgir Jónsson would replace Arnar Már Magnússon as CEO. In May 2021, the airline announced the registration of its AOC, as well as the acquisition of its first aircraft, an Airbus A321neo. Soon after, the airline began ticket sales for its first flights, the operations of which launched with its inaugural flight from Keflavík International Airport to London Stansted Airport on 24 June 2021. On the same day as its maiden flight, Play launched an initial public offering (IPO), seeking to raise at least 3.9–4.3 billion Icelandic króna (U.S. $32 to 35 million), after which its shares would be traded on Nasdaq First North Growth Market Iceland. The IPO concluded on 25 June 2021 with an eight-fold oversubscription in the offering, with total subscriptions received for 33.8 billion Icelandic króna (U.S. $274 million).

In August 2021, Play applied to the United States Department of Transportation for the operation of flights between Keflavík and the U.S. east coast starting in the summer of 2022. Its application was subsequently approved and the airline on 16 December 2021 announced its first services to the U.S. with flights to Baltimore and Boston, launching in April and May 2022, respectively. In January 2023, Play announced it would launch its first destination in Canada, with flights between Keflavík and John C. Munro Hamilton International Airport in Ontario, launching in June 2023.

In March 2024, Play announced its first African destination with service to Marrakesh Menara Airport to launch in October 2024. Later that month, Einar Örn Ólafsson succeeded Birgir Jónsson as the airline's CEO. In October 2024, Play announced its first Asian destination with service to Antalya Airport to launch in April 2025.

=== Demise ===
The airline announced a planned transition in its business model in late 2024, including the establishment of an AOC in Malta, and refocusing from connecting traffic between Europe and North America, to traffic between Iceland and European leisure destinations amidst the airline's weakening financial results. This resulted in the termination of some destinations on both continents in 2025, alongside its previously announced establishment of leisure destinations in Europe, western Africa, and western Asia. Its Maltese AOC was issued on 27 March 2025, to its subsidiary Play Europe. Through the subsidiary, the airline announced it would first wet lease three aircraft through 2027 beginning in the spring of 2025.

Further changes to Play's business model were proposed in June 2025, including transitioning to a privately held company and ending its remaining routes to the U.S. by the end of October 2025. In addition, it would dedicate three more aircraft to wet lease operations, totaling six, with the remaining four aircraft to be retained for Iceland-based scheduled operations. Play would also surrender its Icelandic AOC and become a virtual airline in Iceland, retaining its Maltese AOC held by its Play Europe subsidiary for operations. The proposed transition to a private holding however was later dropped.

On 29 September 2025, the airline ceased operations, immediately canceling all flights. About 400 employees of the airline lost their job. In a statement, the management informed passengers that "all flights of the company have been cancelled" and recommended that affected passengers search for alternative carriers offering special 'rescue fares'.

== Corporate affairs ==
The key trends of Play were (as at the financial year ending 31 December):

	Turnover (US$m)	Profit after tax (US$m)	Number of employees	Number of passengers (m)	Passenger load factor (%)	Number of served destinations	Number of aircraft	Sources
2021	16.4	−22.5	150	0.10	53	25	3	
2022	139	−45.5	323	0.79	80	25	6	
2023	281	−35.2	511	1.52	83	38	10	
2024	292	−66	453	1.65	85.3	42	10	

== Destinations ==
Countries served by Play when operations ceased

Play operated to destinations in Africa, Asia, Europe, and North America from its hub at Keflavík International Airport.

=== Interline agreements ===
Play had virtual interlining agreements with the following airlines:

- Alaska Airlines
- Azores Airlines
- easyJet
- Jet2.com
- Norwegian Air Shuttle
- Sky Express
- Spirit Airlines
- Vueling

== Fleet ==
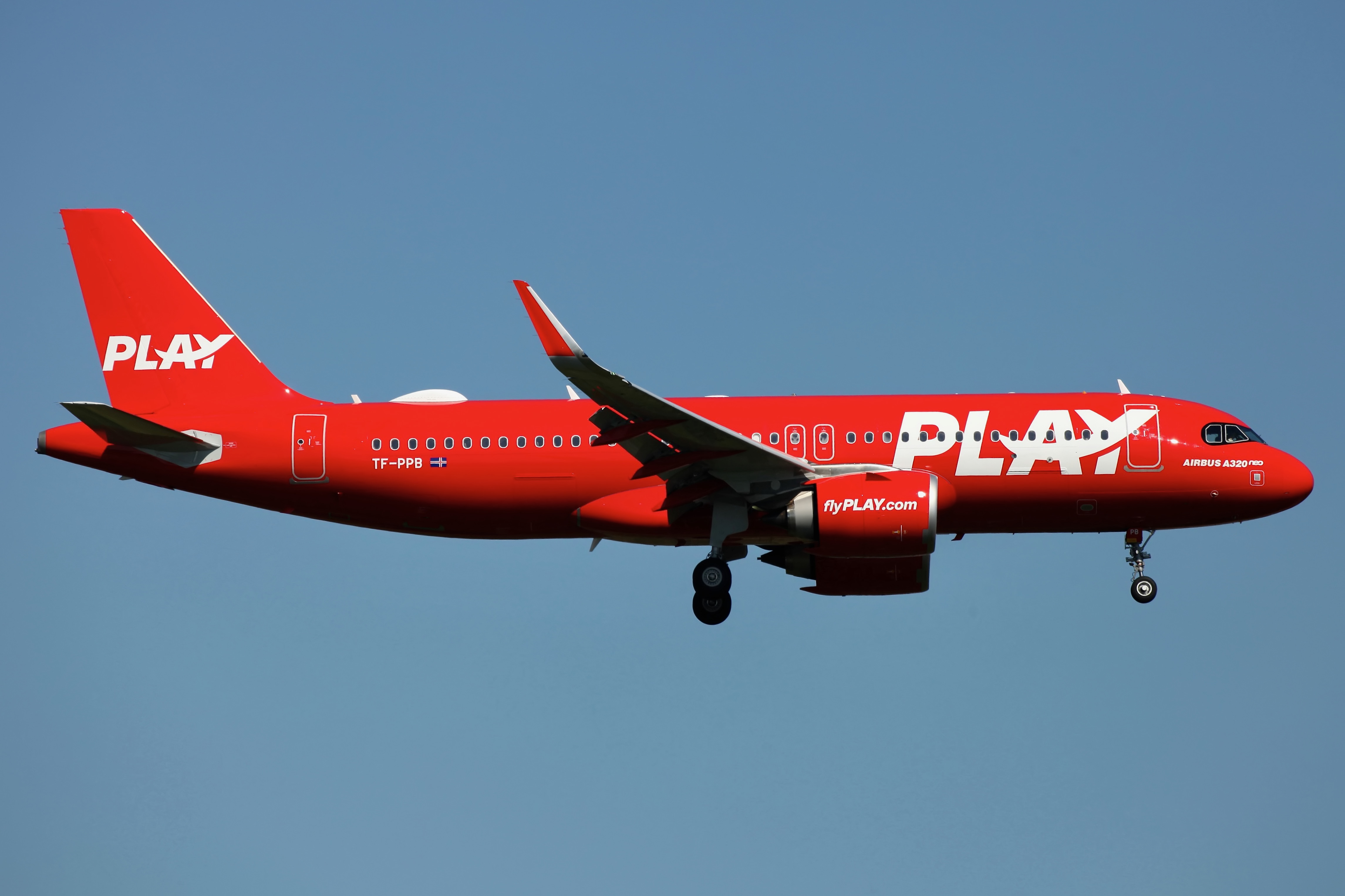
Play Airbus A320neo

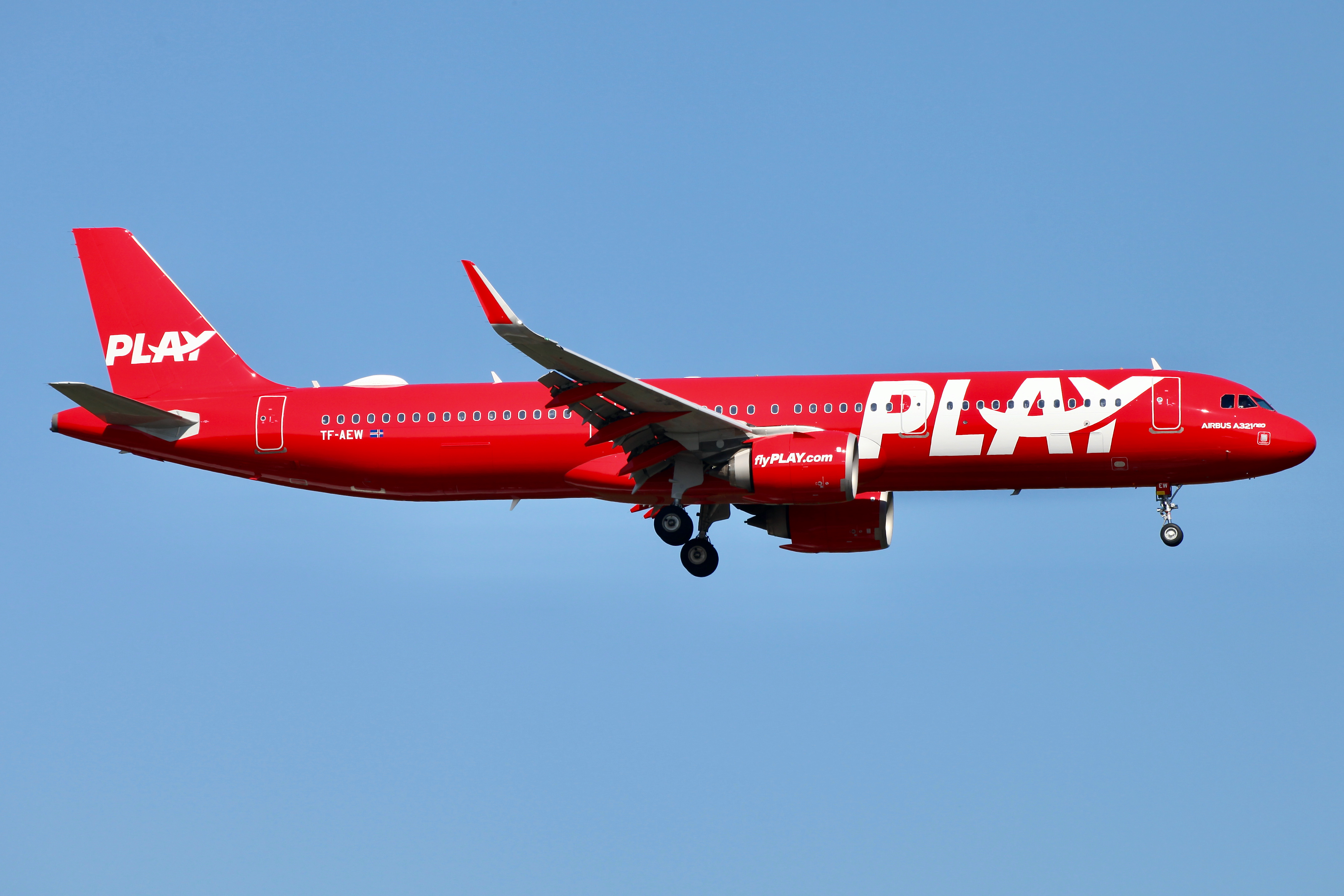
Play Airbus A321neo

=== Final fleet ===
As of 29 September 2025, when the airline ceased operations, Play operated an all-Airbus A320neo fleet composed of the following aircraft:

Play fleet
Aircraft	In service	Orders	Passengers	Notes
Airbus A320neo	6	—	174	
Airbus A320neo	6	—	180	
Total	6	—		

=== Fleet development ===
Play's initial fleet consisted of three Airbus A321neo aircraft, all of which were formerly operated by defunct Mexican airline Interjet. In September 2021, the airline announced its first fleet expansion with orders for three Airbus A320neo aircraft and a fourth A321neo aircraft, adding to its existing fleet of three A321neo aircraft, with deliveries between late 2022 and early 2023. The airline also signed a letter of intent in August to receive two A320neo aircraft by early 2022, prior to any of the other aircraft that were already on order, with the agreement subsequently signed as a firm order in November 2021. In early 2022, Play specified that an Airbus A321neo it was due to receive in anticipation of its recently announced Orlando route would be the A321LR variant, for delivery during May 2022, and that it planned to operate a total of ten aircraft by early 2023. In May 2022, Play decided to halt delivery of its Airbus A321LR and cancel the planned Orlando route due to rising fuel costs. The airline instead replaced the A321LR with an A320neo, thereby planning to operate a fleet of three A320neo aircraft and three A321neo aircraft for summer 2022. In early 2023, the airline's A321neo aircraft began seating reconfigurations to increase their capacity from 192 to 214.

== See also ==
- List of airlines of Iceland
- List of defunct airlines of Iceland
