= City Star Airlines =

Airline based in Scotland

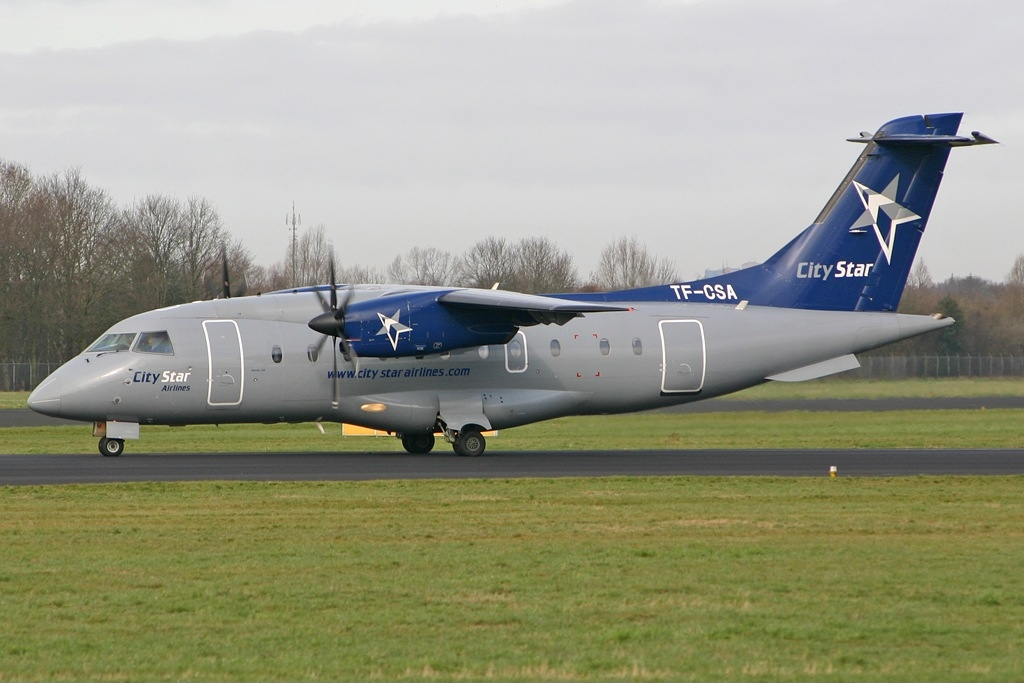
- Dornier 328-110
IATA	ICAO	Call sign
X9	ISL	ISLANDIA
- Founded: 2004
- Commenced operations: March 2005
- Ceased operations: January 2008
- Hubs: Aberdeen Airport
- Fleet size: 0
- Destinations: 7
- Parent company: Eignarhaldsfélagið City Star Airlines
- Headquarters: Aberdeen, Scotland, United Kingdom
- Website: http://www.citystarairlines.com

City Star Airlines (CSA) was an airline based in Aberdeen, Scotland. It operated under the Air Operator's Certificate (AOC) of Landsflug in Iceland. Its main task was scheduled services between energy industry centres in Scotland and Norway, as well as charter services. Its main base was Aberdeen Airport. In a press release on 30 January 2008, City Star Airlines announced that it was to immediately cease all operations until further notice.

== History ==
City Star Airlines started operations on 28 March 2005 with one aircraft flying between Aberdeen, Scotland (Aberdeen Airport) and Oslo, Norway (Oslo Gardermoen Airport) in cooperation with and on the AOC of domestic airline Landsflug in Iceland. CSA's owners acquired a controlling share in Landsflug in 2005 in order to acquire JAR-OPS 1 licensed operator status for its operation.

On 22 June 2006, a City Star Airlines Dornier 328 (TF-CSB) operating a passenger flight from Stavanger, Norway, overshot the end of the runway at Aberdeen Airport by several hundred yards as it came in to land. None of the 16 passengers and 3 crew members on board were injured. The incident caused the airline to announce a suspension of all flight operations on 23 June 2006, although service was resumed a few days later.

In March 2007, a Dornier 328 operated by CSA flying from Aberdeen to Sumburgh Airport in the Shetland Islands flew too close to cliffs and failed to respond to terrain warnings, although it did land safely. The United Kingdom's Air Accidents Investigation Branch recommended a safety audit. CSA first suspended the 61-year-old pilot and then asked him to resign. An investigation found that the incident occurred because of a jammed throttle.

CSA announced on 1 September 2007 that its holding company had purchased Caledonian Airborne Engineering, a company providing engineering, maintenance, and ground handling facilities at Aberdeen and Newcastle Airports. The purchase increased the company's employee base by an additional 60.

On 22 December 2007 CSA's holding company stated that it would commence the first long haul, business class-only flights from Aberdeen Airport to Houston, Texas starting in 2008. In November 2007, a CSA plane was involved in an accident at Aberdeen airport and was grounded. That December, the airline postponed its plans to provide routes to Ålesund as a result of the accident. In late January 2008, the airline announced its closure. A spokesman stated that it was a direct result of the damage from the accident.

== Destinations ==
City Star Airlines operated scheduled services to the following destinations

Norway

- Ålesund (Ålesund Airport, Vigra)
- Bergen (Bergen Airport, Flesland)
- Kristiansund (Kristiansund Airport, Kvernberget)
- Oslo (Oslo Gardermoen Airport)
- Stavanger (Stavanger Airport, Sola)

United Kingdom

- Aberdeen, Scotland (Aberdeen Airport)

The Netherlands

- Groningen, (Groningen Airport Eelde)

== Fleet ==
As City Star Airlines was not a licensed airline, it never had any aircraft registered. The aircraft it operated were dry leased from sister company Landsflug. This fleet consisted of the following aircraft (as of September 2007):

- 4 Dornier 328-110

The 32 seater aircraft were also used for private charters.

== See also ==
- List of defunct airlines of the United Kingdom
