= Odin Air =

Icelandic airline, 1964–1998

IATA	ICAO	Call sign
5H	ODI	ODINN
- Founded: 1964
- Ceased operations: 1998

Odin Air was an Icelandic airline which was based in Reykjavík Airport in Reykjavík, which operated from 1964 to 1998.

== History ==
Founded in 1964, Helgi Jonossonar Air Taxi was a charter airline and flew the Piper PA-23 Apache and Piper Navajo to Denmark and other airports in Iceland. It was founded by the owners of the renowned Flugskoli Helga Jonsonnar. Their first flight was operated by TF-AIB, a Cessna 140.

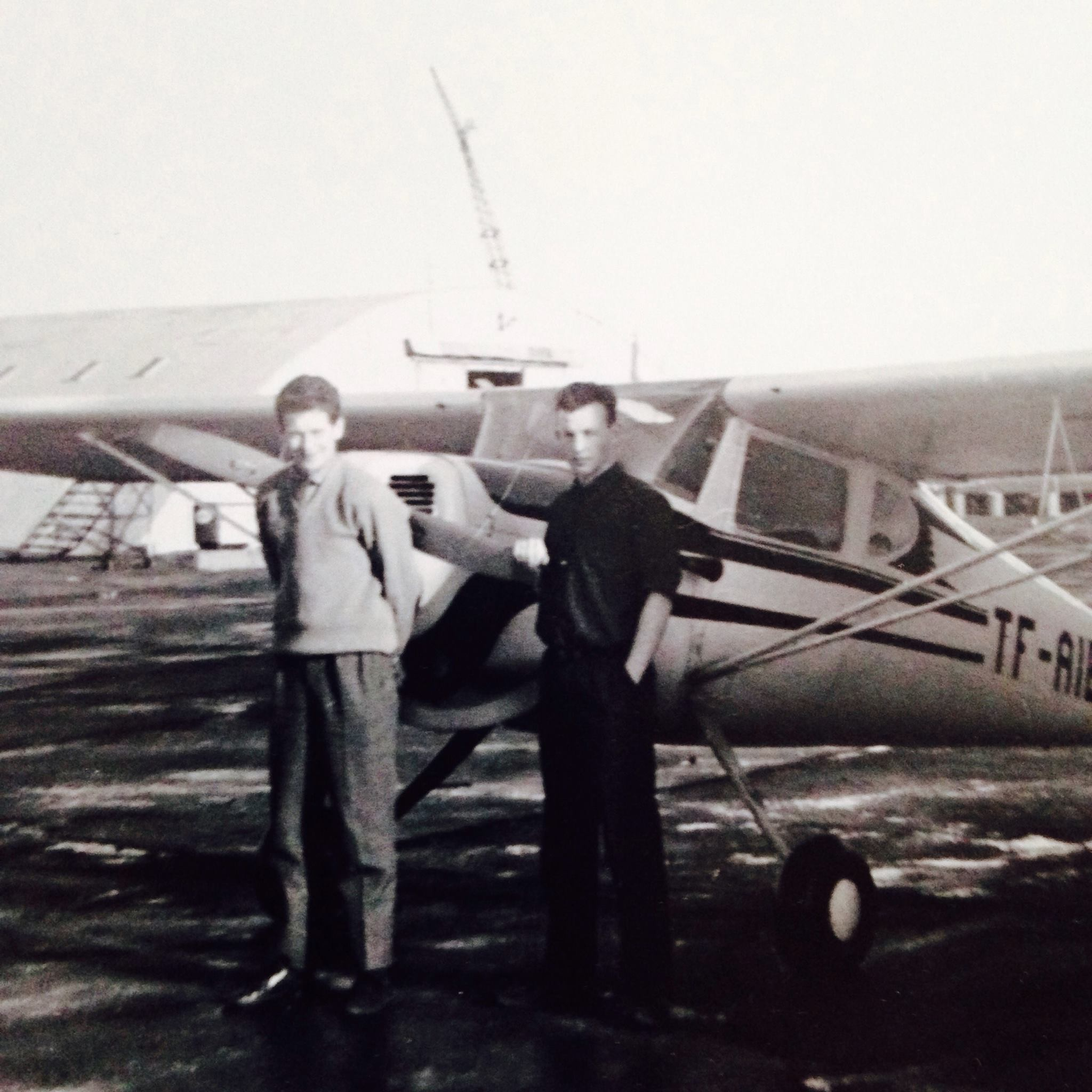
The first Odin Air flight in 1964. The founders are present in the photo.

In 1989 it rebranded as Odin Air, and bought three Handley Page Jetstream.

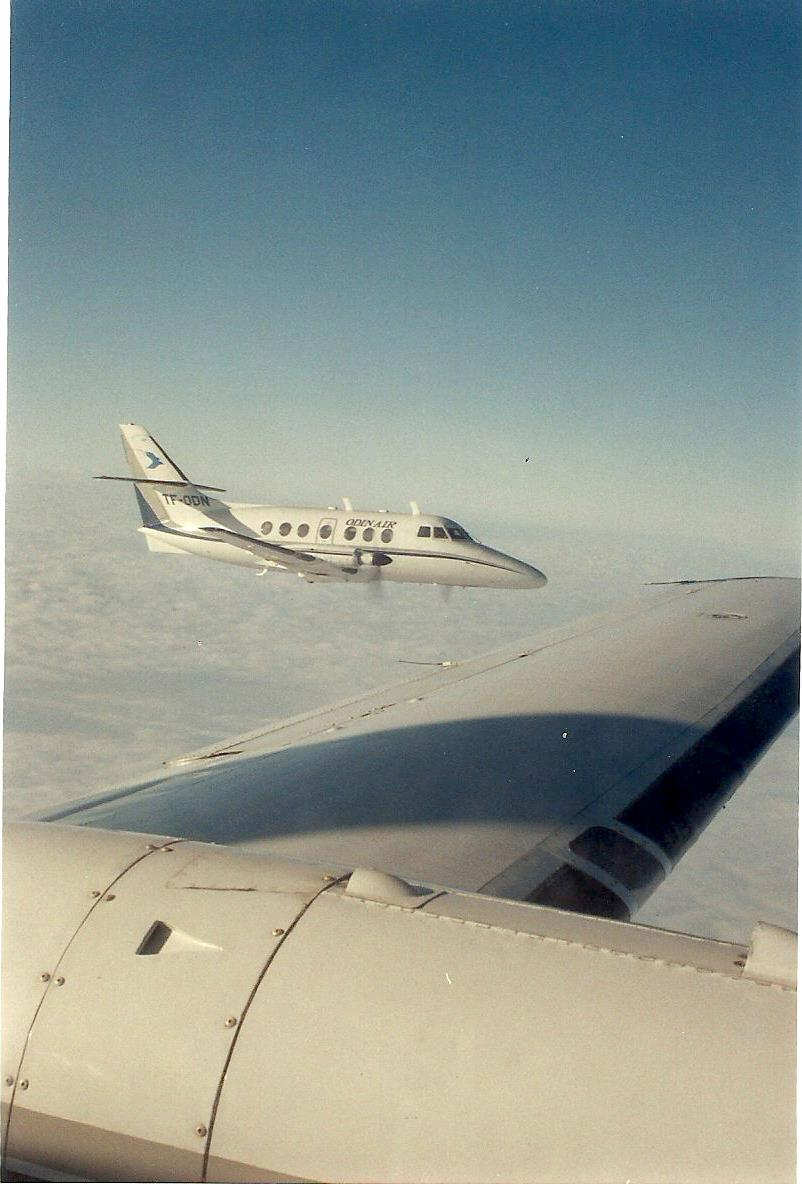
British Jetstream Aircraft TF-ODN, seen from TF-ODM.

It flew to more remote parts of Iceland and carried passengers and cargo across Iceland in the 1960s. This continued into the 70s and flew charter flights across Iceland.

In 1989, the airline finally decided to operate scheduled flights and abandon taxi flights across the rough gravel and snow. The airline bought three Jetstream aircraft, (TF-ODI,TF-ODM and TF-ODN) and bought more aircraft with more capacity.

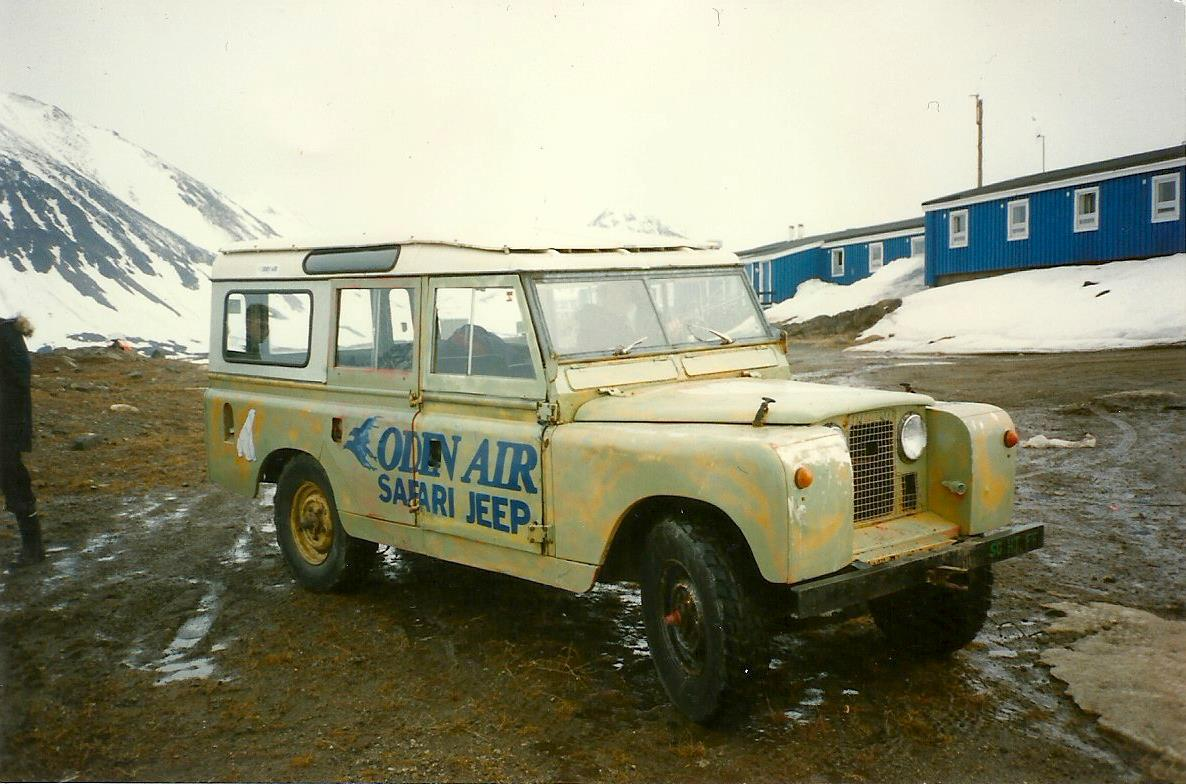
The Safari Jeep used by Odin Air with markings on the side.

In the 90s, the airline flew across the country doing scheduled flights. They also occasionally flew to the United States.

However, by 1997, Odin Air couldn't compete with the likes of Air Iceland Connect, Icelandair, and Loftleiðir.

As a result, Odin Air was no longer profitable and by 1998, was officially declared no longer operational by the Icelandic Air Agencies.

== Fleet ==
=== Current fleet ===
As of 1998, Odin Air operated the following aircraft.

Odin Air Fleet
Aircraft	In service	Orders	Passengers	Notes
Handley Page Jetstream
Handley Page Jetstream	Total	3 TF-ODN, TF-ODM, TF-ODE		
Mitshubishi MU-2 "TF-FHM"				
Mitshubishi MU-2 "TF-FHM"	Total	3 TF-FHM,TF-FHL,TF-FHJ		

=== Former fleet ===
Prior to 1991, Odin Air operated the following aircraft types:

Aircraft	Total	Introduced	Retired	Replacement	Notes
Piper PA-23	1	1964	1989	Handley Page Jetstream	TF-BAA.
Piper Navajo	1	1965	1989	Handley Page Jetstream	TF-ODE.
Cessna 140	1	1964	1964	Piper PA-23 Apache	TF-AIB.

== See also ==
List of defunct airlines of Iceland List of airlines of Iceland
