= List of Play destinations =

This is a list of destinations that Play operated to as of July 2025, prior to ceasing operations. Originally established in July 2019, the Icelandic low-cost airline launched flights from its hub at Keflavík International Airport in June 2021, initially with flights within Europe. Starting in April 2022, the airline began operating flights to North America. In October 2024, the airline began its first flights to Africa, and in April 2025, it began its first flights to Asia.

== List ==
Country	City / Region	Airport	Start date	End date	Notes	Refs
Austria	Salzburg	Salzburg Airport	22 January 2022	2 March 2024	Terminated	
Belgium	Brussels	Brussels Airport	24 May 2022	29 September 2025	Seasonal	
Canada	Hamilton	John C. Munro Hamilton International Airport	22 June 2023	22 April 2025	Terminated	
Croatia	Split	Split Airport	28 May 2024	29 September 2025	Seasonal	
Czech Republic	Prague	Václav Havel Airport Prague	5 May 2022	29 September 2025	Seasonal	
Denmark	Aalborg	Aalborg Airport	10 June 2023; 28 June 2025	29 September 2025	Seasonal	
Denmark	Billund	Billund Airport	15 June 2023	29 September 2025	Seasonal	
Denmark	Copenhagen	Copenhagen Airport	22 July 2021	29 September 2025		
France	Paris	Charles de Gaulle Airport	15 July 2021	29 September 2025		
Germany	Berlin	Berlin Brandenburg Airport	2 July 2021	29 September 2025		
Germany	Düsseldorf	Düsseldorf Airport	8 June 2023	17 April 2024	Terminated	
Germany	Frankfurt	Frankfurt Airport	14 December 2023	2 April 2024	Terminated	
Germany	Hamburg	Hamburg Airport	16 May 2023	17 April 2024	Terminated	
Greece	Athens	Athens International Airport	2 June 2023	29 September 2025	Seasonal	
Iceland	Reykjavík	Keflavík International Airport	24 June 2021	29 September 2025	Hub	
Ireland	Dublin	Dublin Airport	28 April 2022	29 September 2025		
Italy	Bologna	Bologna Guglielmo Marconi Airport	7 June 2022	2024	Terminated	
Italy	Venice	Venice Marco Polo Airport	29 June 2023	3 October 2024	Terminated	
Italy	Verona	Verona Villafranca Airport	20 January 2024	29 September 2025	Seasonal	
Lithuania	Vilnius	Vilnius Airport	25 May 2024	29 September 2025	Seasonal	
Morocco	Agadir	Agadir–Al Massira Airport	19 December 2025	—	Future (Seasonal)	
Morocco	Marrakesh	Marrakesh Menara Airport	17 October 2024	29 September 2025	Seasonal	
Netherlands	Amsterdam	Amsterdam Airport Schiphol	3 December 2021; 5 June 2023	29 September 2025		
Norway	Stavanger	Stavanger Airport	26 May 2022	11 September 2022	Terminated	
Norway	Trondheim	Trondheim Airport	31 May 2022	6 August 2022	Terminated	
Poland	Warsaw	Warsaw Chopin Airport	3 April 2023	29 September 2025	Seasonal	
Portugal	Faro	Faro Airport	12 April 2025	29 September 2025	Seasonal	
Portugal	Funchal	Madeira Airport	15 October 2024	29 September 2025	Seasonal	
Portugal	Lisbon	Lisbon Airport	13 May 2022	29 September 2025		
Portugal	Porto	Porto Airport	6 April 2023	29 September 2025	Seasonal	
Spain	Alicante	Alicante–Elche Miguel Hernández Airport	13 July 2021	29 September 2025		
Spain	Barcelona	Josep Tarradellas Barcelona–El Prat Airport	16 July 2021	29 September 2025		
Spain	Fuerteventura	Fuerteventura Airport	20 December 2023	29 September 2025	Seasonal	
Spain	Gran Canaria	Gran Canaria Airport	22 December 2021	29 September 2025	Seasonal	
Spain	Madrid	Madrid–Barajas Airport	15 June 2022	29 September 2025		
Spain	Málaga	Málaga Airport	29 May 2022	29 September 2025		
Spain	Palma de Mallorca	Palma de Mallorca Airport	1 June 2022	26 September 2024	Terminated	
Spain	Tenerife	Tenerife South Airport	29 June 2021	29 September 2025		
Spain	Valencia	Valencia Airport	22 July 2025	29 September 2025	Seasonal	
Sweden	Gothenburg	Göteborg Landvetter Airport	20 May 2022	26 August 2024	Terminated	
Sweden	Stockholm	Stockholm Arlanda Airport	31 March 2023	11 August 2024	Terminated	
Switzerland	Geneva	Geneva Airport	21 January 2023	29 September 2025	Seasonal	
Turkey	Antalya	Antalya Airport	15 April 2025	29 September 2025	Seasonal	
United Kingdom	Cardiff	Cardiff Airport	10 October 2024	20 November 2024	Terminated	
United Kingdom	Glasgow	Glasgow Airport	26 May 2023	2 January 2024	Terminated	
United Kingdom	Liverpool	Liverpool John Lennon Airport	7 October 2022	29 September 2025	Seasonal	
United Kingdom	London	London Stansted Airport	24 June 2021	29 September 2025		
United States	Baltimore	Baltimore/Washington International Airport	20 April 2022	29 September 2025		
United States	Boston	Logan International Airport	11 May 2022	15 September 2025	Terminated	
United States	Newburgh	Stewart International Airport	9 June 2022	1 September 2025	Terminated	
United States	Washington, D.C.	Dulles International Airport	26 April 2023	3 December 2024	Terminated	
