= Vertical de Aviación =

Colombian charter airline

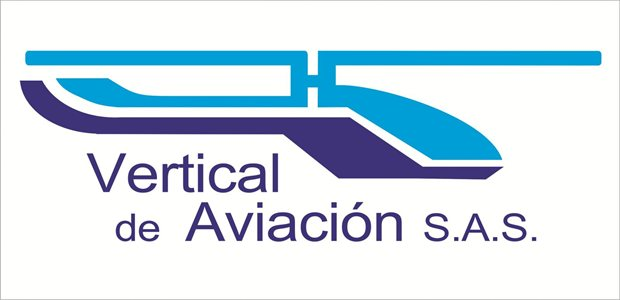
- Founded: 1982
- Ceased operations: August 2023
- Hubs: El Dorado International Airport
- Fleet size: 26
- Headquarters: Bogotá, Colombia
- Website: www.verticaldeaviacion.com

Vertical de Aviación S.A.S. was a charter airline based at El Dorado International Airport in Bogotá, Colombia. As the name implies, it flew mainly helicopters, but the company also operated fixed-wing aircraft such as the Jetstream 32.

Although the company transported passengers and cargo, it had a much broader business model and scope focusing on Defense, Oil, Logistics, and Government sectors. During 2017, it operated in Colombia, Peru, Ecuador, Brazil, Nigeria, Mexico, and Bolivia and has operated in Afghanistan through U.S. Transportation Command Directorate of Acquisition contracts.

== History ==
Vertical de Aviación was founded in 1982, operating Bell helicopters. It was the first Colombian airline to operate Russian helicopters transporting passengers and cargo.

In August 2023, the company was liquidated.

== Fleet ==
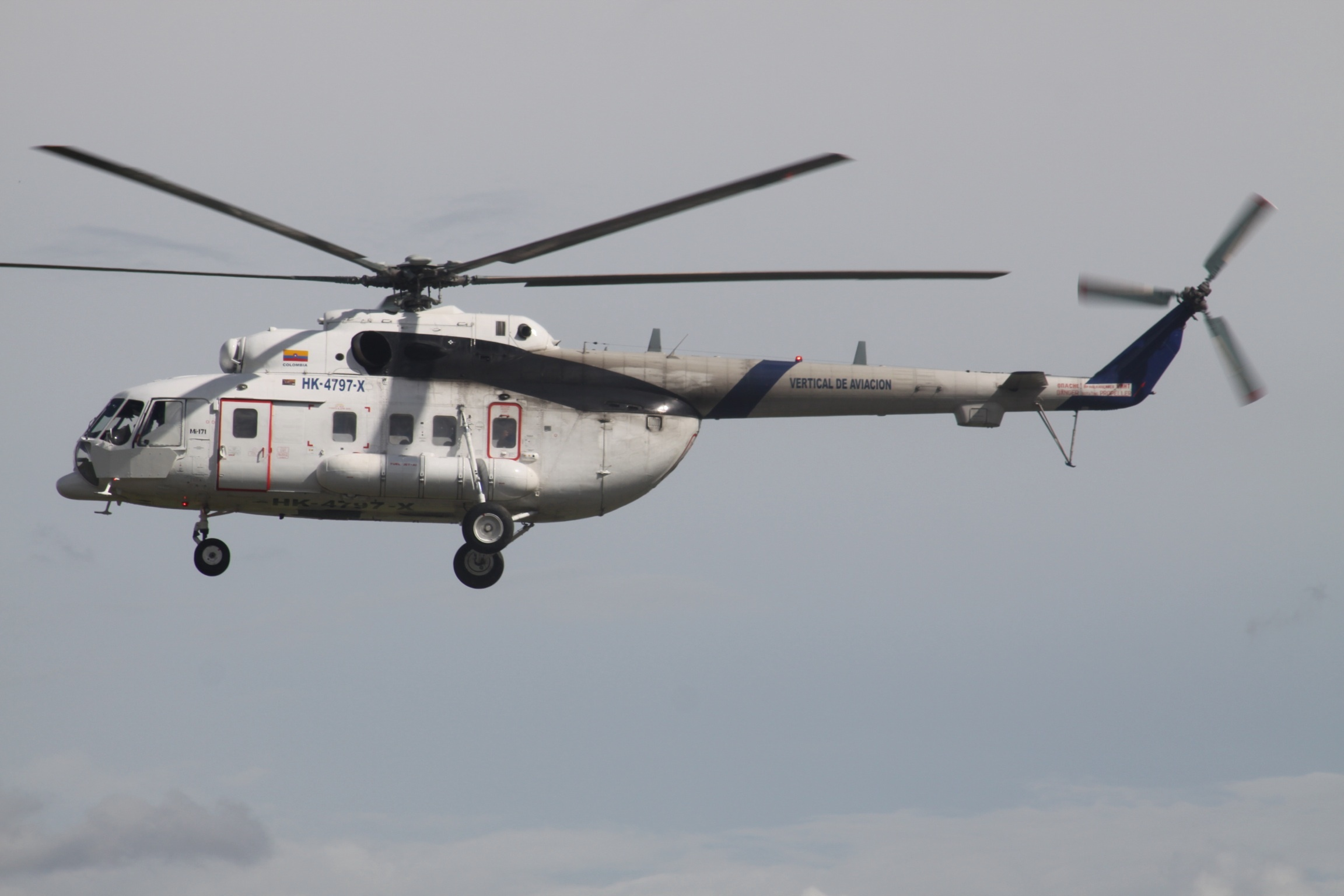
Vertical de Aviación MI-171

As of 2017, the company's fleet was composed of the following:

- 12 MI-171
- 4 Mil Mi-8 MI-171A1
- 4 MI-8 MTV
- 2 Sikorsky S-76d

Fixed wing

- 4 BAe Jetstream J-32 (turboprop aircraft)
