= AIR OPS =

EU OPS is a European Union (EU) regulations specifying minimum safety and related procedures for commercial passenger and cargo fixed-wing aviation. The legislation is known officially as Council Regulation (EEC) No 3922/91 on the harmonisation of technical requirements and administrative procedures in the field of civil aviation.

The regulations are derived from and very similar to JAR-OPS 1, after consultations between the EU and Joint Aviation Authorities (JAA) in 1997. Since then, the regulations are about to be superseded by EASA-OPS. The regulations concern Training, Documentation, Procedures and Compliances in the following categories

- Operator certification and supervision
- Operational procedures
- All weather operations
- Performance general
- Performance class a
- Performance class b
- Performance class c
- Mass and balance
- Instruments and equipment
- Communication and navigation equipment
- Aeroplane maintenance
- Flight crew
- Cabin crew
- Manuals, logs and records
- Flight and duty time limitations and rest requirements
- Transport of dangerous goods by air
- Security

== Coming Rules of Air Operations ==
The European Commission published Regulation (EU) 800/2013 on air operations on 24 August 2013. It amends Regulation (EU) 965/2012 laying down technical requirements and administrative procedures related to air operations pursuant to Regulation (EC) No 216/2008 of the European Parliament and of the Council and extends its scope to non-commercial operations with aeroplanes, helicopters, balloons and sailplanes.

== Rules in Europe ==
Despite their importance for aviation safety, European flight time rules did not exist until recently. It is only since July 2008, that EU Member States must respect the “EU-OPS” Regulation’s Subpart Q (in Annex III) that regulates Flight Time Limitations (FTL) for air crew.

With this EU-OPS Subpart Q, the EU introduced, for the first time in history, a harmonized, legally binding minimum set of FTL safety rules aimed at preventing pilot fatigue across Europe. While individual EU countries can apply stricter FTL rules at national level, they are not allowed to go below the minimum set by EU-OPS, unless they apply for a specific derogation.

In addition to the legal requirements, Collective Labour Agreements (CLAs) at company level often include FTL provisions, specifically tailored to the conditions of that company. These CLA rules cannot set lower safety levels than EU-OPS, and in most cases they actually provide for stricter FTL provisions than the national laws or EU-OPS. They therefore provide for higher safety levels than required by law.

While setting a minimum safety level, Subpart Q is by no means ideal. Its main weakness is that it has never been subject to a scientific and medical evaluation. Hence, Subpart Q’s provisions are not based on sound scientific evidence as to their ability to prevent pilot fatigue. This is a major weakness, as it means that today’s rules do not ensure passengers can enjoy highest, scientifically supported safety levels when boarding a European airplane.

Also, Subpart Q does not cover key FTL aspects that are crucial for flight safety, such as “split duty”, augmented crew on long-haul flights, some forms of standby, etc. These areas are currently left to the national legislator, leading to different national legal provisions across Europe.
