= Arctica Finance =

Arctica Finance hf.
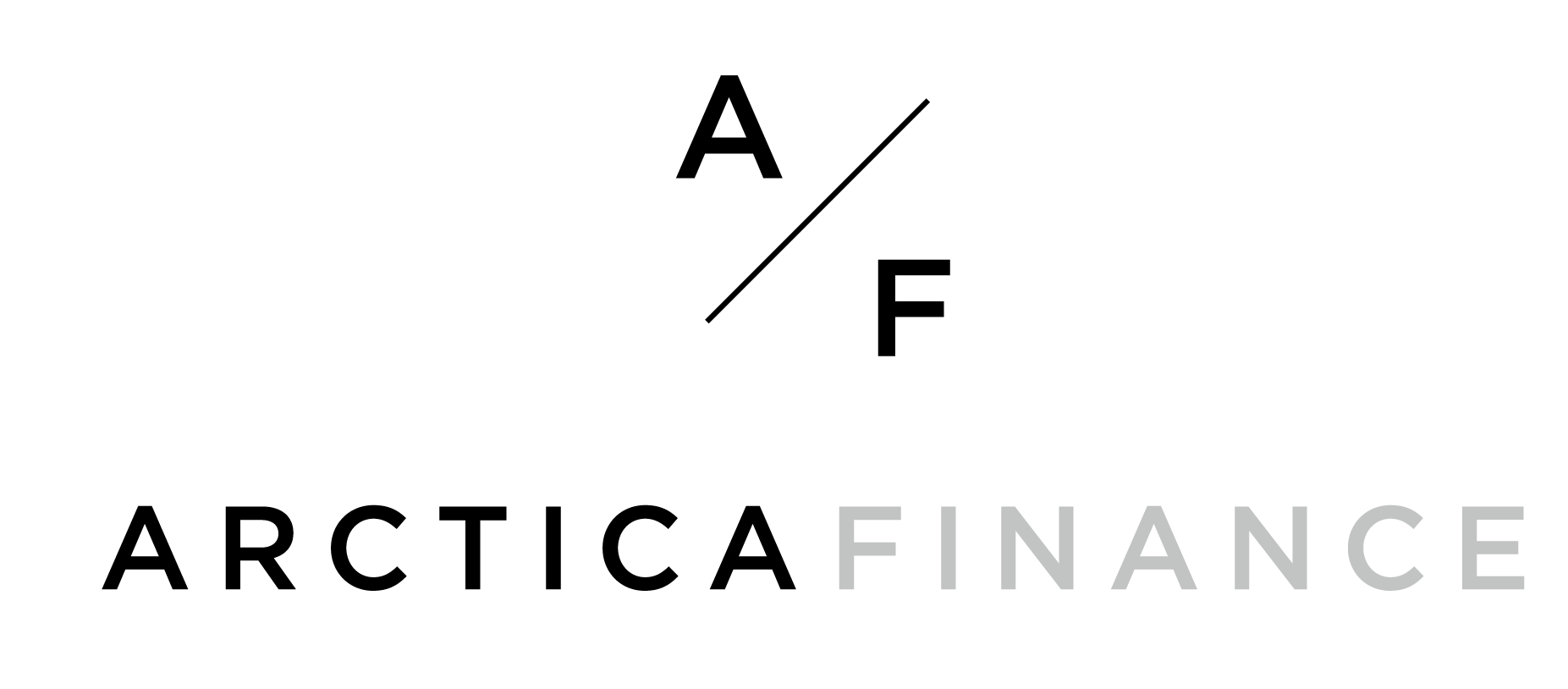
- Company type: Public company
- Industry: Financial services
- Founded: 2008
- Headquarters: Reykjavík, Iceland
- Website: www.arctica.is

Arctica Finance is an Icelandic securities brokerage firm headquartered in Reykjavík. It was established in 2008 by former key employees of Landsbanki, which failed during the 2008–2011 Icelandic financial crisis.

== History ==
In 2011 the company returned a 247 million ISK profit.

In 2015 Arctica Finance bought securities brokerage firm H.F. Verðbréf for an undisclosed amount.

Arctica Finance completed in April 2021 a Pre-IPO Private Placement round for the new airline Play with a total transaction size of $47 million in new equity.

In 2019 the company returned a 304 million ISK loss after turning in a 200 million ISK profit the year before.

== Controversies ==
In September 2017 the company was fined 72 million ISK by the Icelandic Financial Supervisory Authority, which was based on the fact that dividends to employees had violated bonus rules. In March 2019, Icelandic district courts lowered the fine to 24 million ISK. In February 2021, the Supreme Court of Iceland rejected Arctica's appeal.

In July 2021 the company was fined 700.000 ISK by the Central Bank of Iceland for breaking the laws on securities transactions by failing to adequately preserve the receipts received from clients.
