= Arnarflug =

Arnarflug/Eagle Air
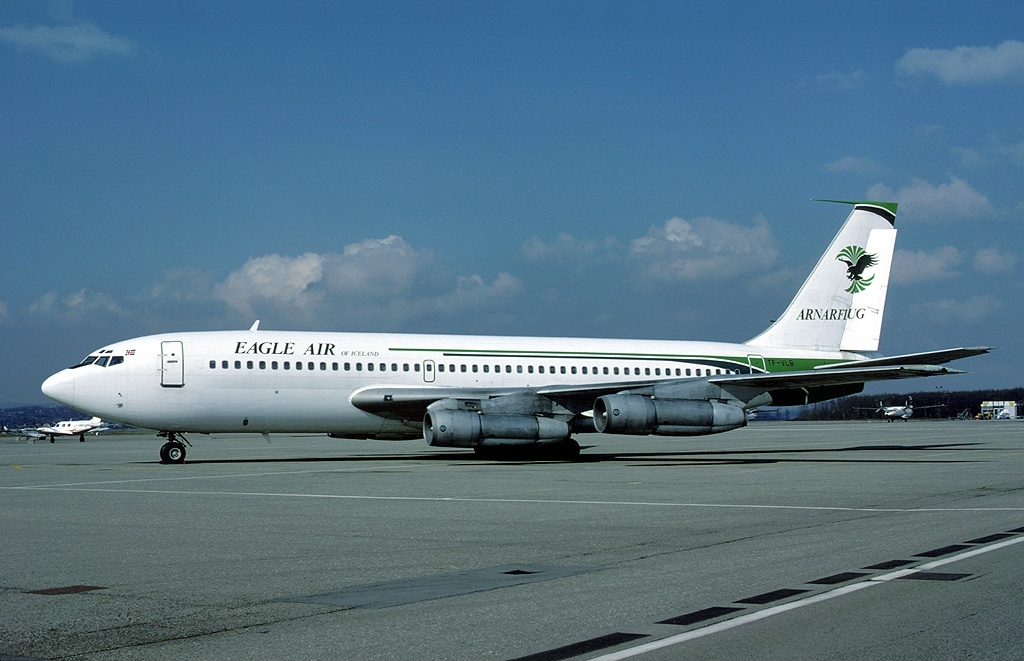
- Boeing 720-047B
- Founded: 10 April 1976
- Commenced operations: 5 June 1976
- Ceased operations: 1994 (interval 19 October 1990-1993)

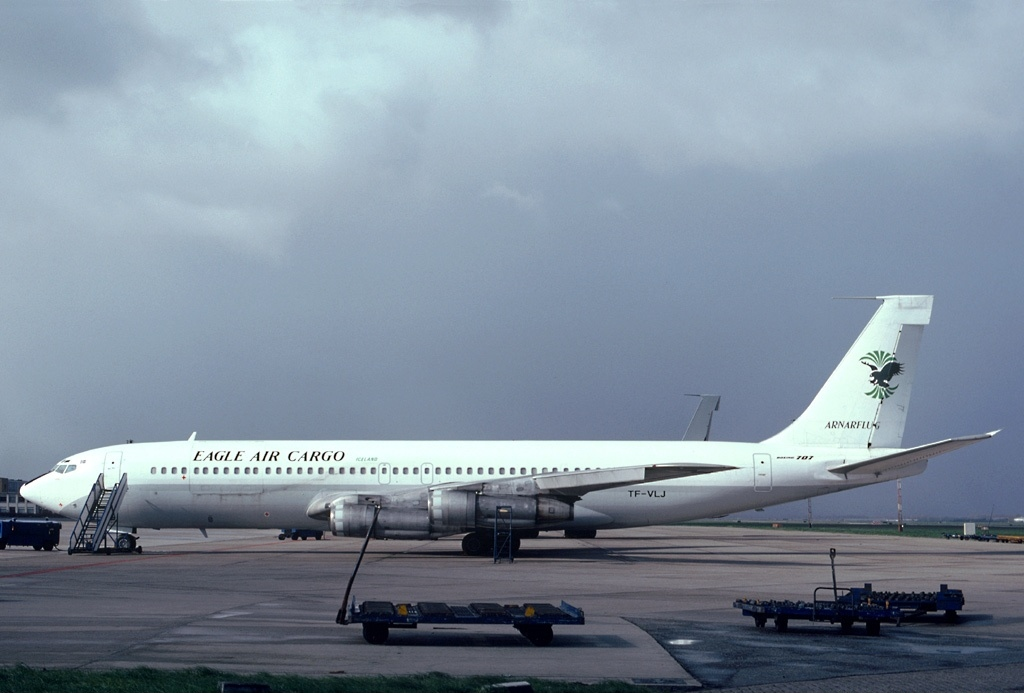
Boeing 707-324C Cargo

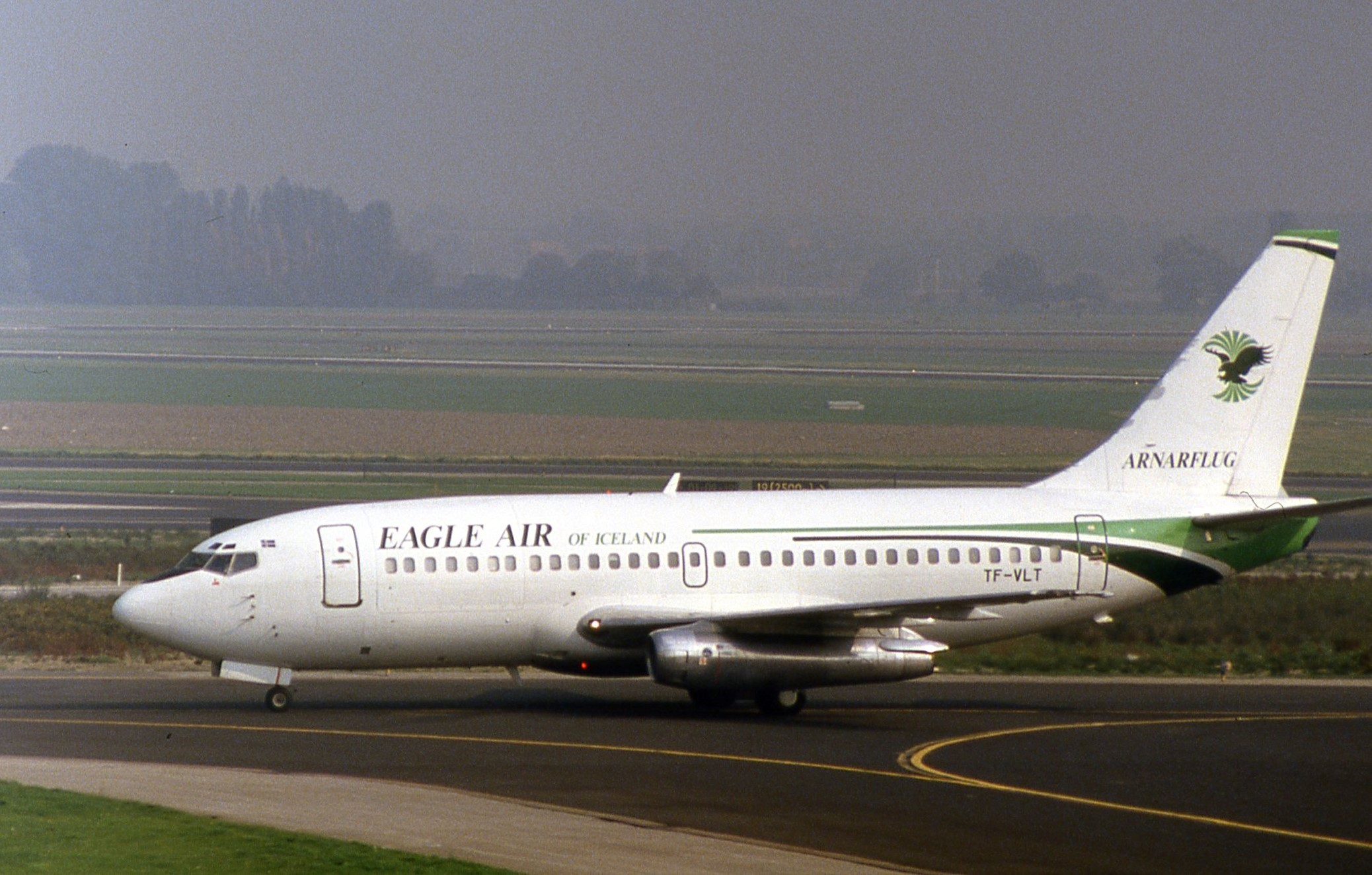
Boeing 737-200

Arnarflug, also known as Eagle Air, was a major Icelandic airline that operated from April 1976 until its bankruptcy in October 1990. It was founded by former employees of Air Viking. Arnarflug was the main competitor of Icelandair during the 1980s. The airline performed domestic and international flights and also run a car rental. The domestic part was made a separate company, Arnarflug Innanlands hf., in May 1987, but in 1991 it merged into Íslandsflug.

After ceasing operations in August 1990 and declaring bankruptcy the following October, the airline was reinstated in 1993 but operated only sporadically until the following year.
