= Cessna Skywagon =

Cessna Skywagon may refer to:

- Cessna 180 Skywagon
- Cessna 185 Skywagon
- Cessna 206 (also 205 and 207), known variously as the Super Skywagon, Skywagon, Stationair, and Super Skylane
