= Landsflug =

Airline based in Iceland

IATA	ICAO	Call sign
X9	ISL	ISLANDIA
- Founded: 2003
- Commenced operations: 2004
- Ceased operations: 2008
- Hubs: Reykjavik Airport
- Fleet size: 5
- Destinations: 5
- Headquarters: Reykjavik Airport
- Website: landsflug.is

Landsflug (Icelandic pronunciation: [ˈlan(t)sˌflʏːɣ], lit. 'Air Domestic') was an airline based in Reykjavík, Iceland. It operated domestic passenger services out of its base at Reykjavik Airport.

== History ==
The airline was established in 2004 and started operations on 1 October 2004, taking over the domestic operations of Islandsflug. The owners of City Star Airlines, a ticket sales office based in Aberdeen, Scotland, acquired the controlling shares of the airline in 2005 in order to acquire JAR OPS 1 licensed operator for its expanding Aberdeen operation. In March 2007, Landsflug had 80 employees. In 2008, the company was disestablished.

== Destinations ==
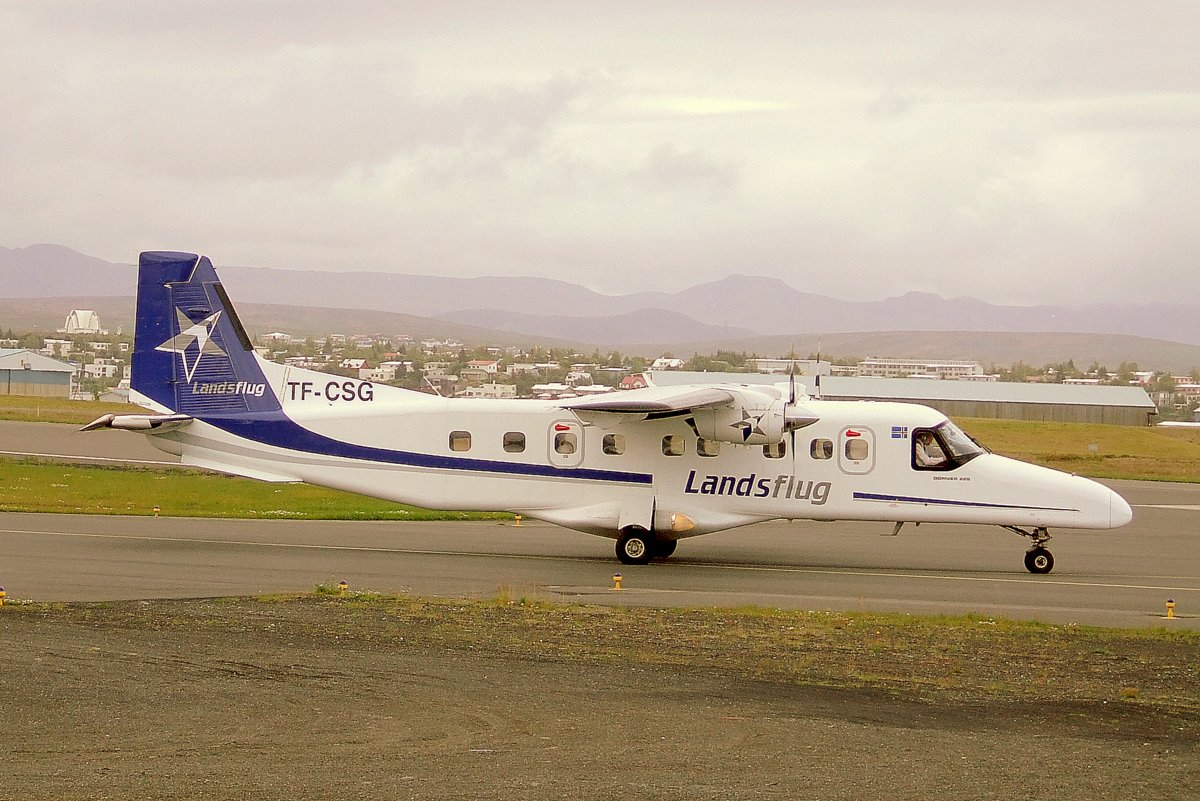
A Landsflug Dornier 228 at Reykjavík Airport

Landsflug operated scheduled services to the following destinations: Vestmannaeyjar, Höfn, Sauðárkrókur, Bíldudalur and Gjögur. Landsflug was also contracted by the Icelandic government to operate medical emergency flights.

== Accidents ==
- 31 August 2004, a Dornier 228 belly-landed at Siglufjordur Airport. The aircraft was written off and stored at Reykjavik Airport before being moved to the Flugsafn (Air Museum) in Akureyri in 2010.

== Fleet ==
In March 2007 the Landsflug fleet included:

- 1 Dornier 328JET
- 2 Dornier 228-212
- 3 Dornier 328-100
