= Reginald Stafford =

Aeronautical engineer (1903–1980)

Reginald Spencer Stafford CBE FRAeS (21 April 1903 –17 August 1980) was an aeronautical engineer, and the designer of the Handley Page Victor.

== Early life ==
Reggie Stafford attended Kilburn Grammar School. He attended Northampton Polytechnic from 1922 to 1926.

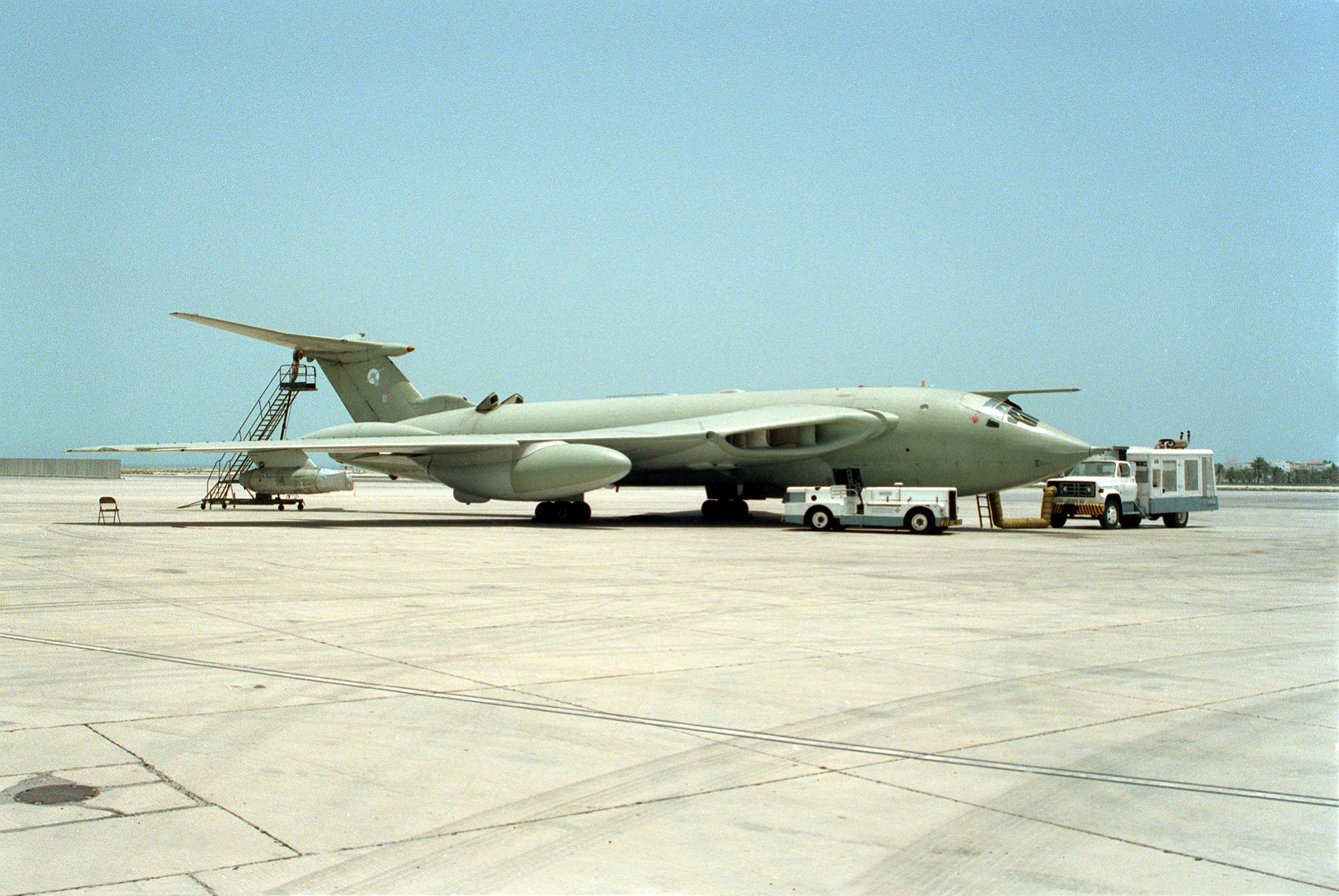
RAF HP Victor in 1993

== Career ==
He worked for Handley Page, joining in 1926. In 1934 he became chief aerodynamicist, and chief designer in 1945, in charge of the design team.

He went on the Fedden Mission to see advanced German technology, and the German Aeronautical Research Institute (Deutsche LFA) at Völkenrode. The subsequent Victor was not dissimilar to some of the bizarre advanced German prototype jet aircraft.

He became Technical Director in 1953. He retired from the company in 1968, after 42 years.

=== Handley Page Victor ===
He designed the HP.80 aircraft with Godfrey Henry Lee. The Victor was known for its crescent wing.

The first HP Victor, WB771, was first flown by Sqn Ldr Hedley Hazelden on 24 December 1952 at Radlett. On 2 January 1953, the aircraft was named Victor by the Air Ministry. The first production Victor XA917 first flew on 1 February 1956.

In 1958 he had designed a transport version of the Victor, the Handley Page HP.111, to carry 27 tons of equipment, or 120 paratroopers, at nine miles a minute. But the British government would not give Handley-Page any more contracts unless it joined BAC or Hawker Siddeley. The government ordered the Short Belfast, of which only ten were built.

In May 1959 he was awarded the RAeS British Gold Medal for Aeronautics. In November 1967 he received an honorary D.Sc. from City University.

== Personal life ==
He lived at 'Pax' on Sherwood Avenue in Ruislip, with daughter Kay and son David, in the 1950s. In the 1956 New Year Honours he received the CBE. He moved to Princes Risborough in 1973.

He died in Aylesbury Vale in Buckinghamshire in 1980 aged 77. His funeral was in Princes Risborough, where he had lived, on Friday 22 August 1980.

== See also ==
- Stuart Davies (engineer), designer of the Avro Vulcan
