= Sky Greenland =

2013–2015 Greenlandic virtual airline

IATA	ICAO	Call sign
—	DNM	DENIM
- Founded: 2013
- Ceased operations: 2015
- Operating bases: Aalborg; Copenhagen; Kangerlussuaq
- Headquarters: Kangerlussuaq, Greenland; Aalborg, Denmark
- Key people: Gert Brask, owner
- Website: greenlandexpress.com

Sky Greenland (formerly known as Greenland Express) was a virtual airline headquartered in Kangerlussuaq, Greenland, which started operations in June 2014, using a sole Fokker 100 leased from Denim Air ACMI.

== History ==
Sky Greenland started operations on 17 June 2014 with two Fokker 100 aircraft (one in storage for possible new routes coming soon, and used for charter services), mainly flying between Greenland and Denmark, Kangerlussuaq - Narsarsuaq - Keflavik - Aalborg - Copenhagen. It had plans to operate from Akureyri in Iceland to other destinations in Europe. (Direct flights from Akureyri save at least four hours of travel time compared to changes at Reykjavík, partly because of the ground transfer needed.) It also had plans to have a hub in Greenland in the future.

Operations were suspended in September 2014, three months after the carrier got airborne. In early 2015, it was announced that the airline was expecting to finalize a three-year wet lease agreement for two Airbus A319 aircraft. In April 2015, the carrier was granted permission to fly domestic services, which were expected to commence before August 2015.

Plans to restart regular services in July and then August 2015 were abandoned.

== Destinations ==
Sky Greenland had plans to operate from Billund Airport and Copenhagen Airport to Kangerlussuaq Airport and Narsarsuaq Airport, but the airline was not able to launch operations in 2015. The airline was going to lease an Airbus A319-100 from BH Air, but problems with payment resulted with the contract not being completed.

== Fleet ==
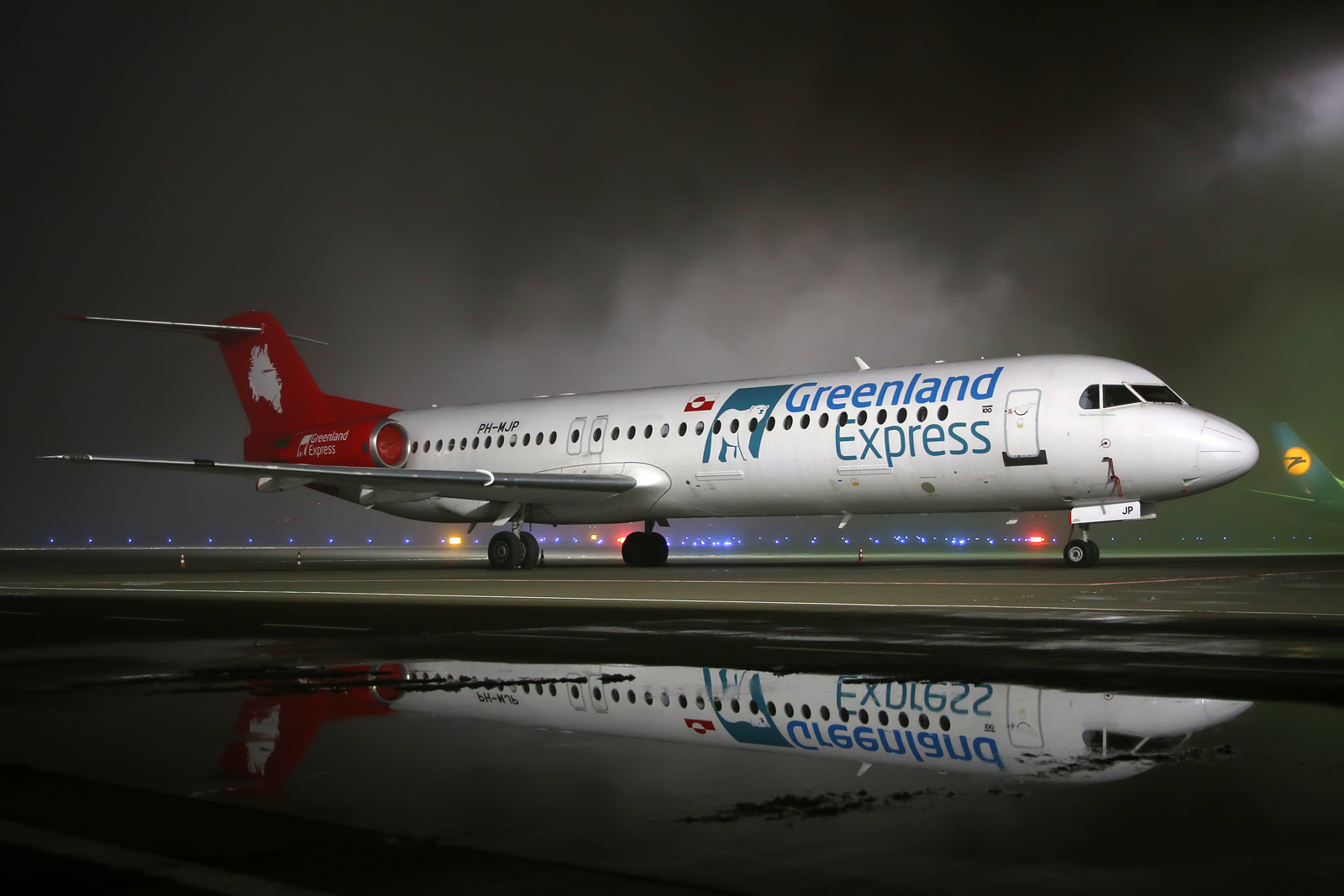
Greenland Express Fokker 100

Aircraft	Total	Orders	Seats	Notes
Fokker 50	—	2	50	
Sukhoi Superjet 100	—	5	98	Were to be leased from Sukhoi.
Total	—	7		
