= Atlantic Island Air =

Icelandic airline

Atlantic Island Air/Atlantsflug
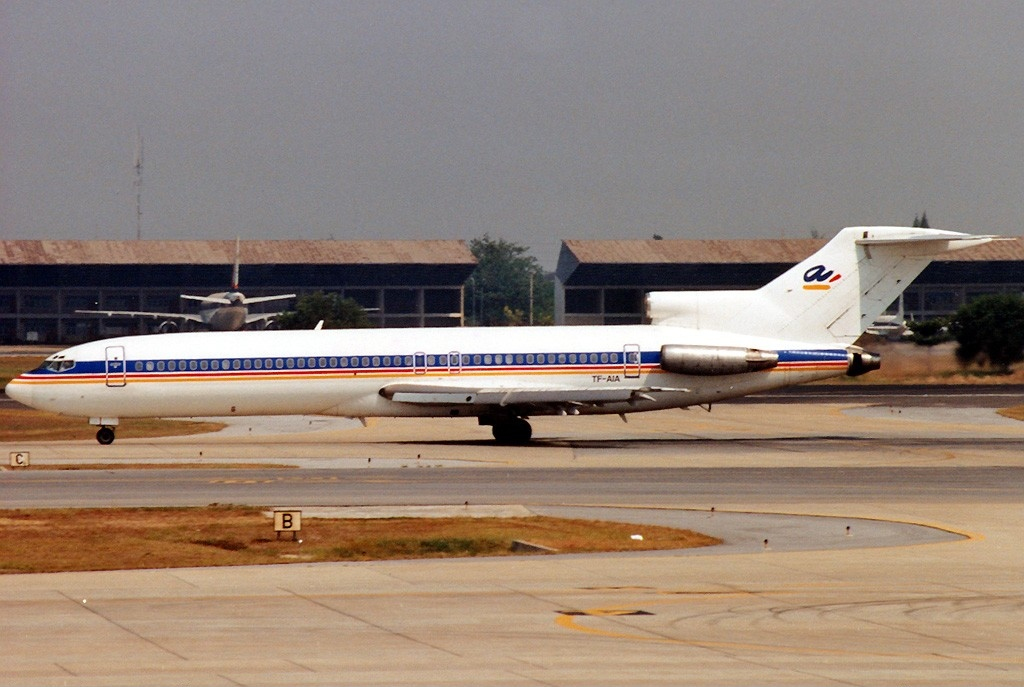
- Boeing 727-200 at Bangkok-Don Mueang airport in 1992
IATA	ICAO	Call sign
ID	TRG	TRIANGLE
- Founded: 1990
- Ceased operations: 17 December 1992
- Hubs: Reykjavík Airport
- Fleet size: See Fleet below
- Headquarters: Iceland

Atlantic Island Air or Atlantsflug was an Icelandic airline that existed in the early 1990s. It only operated charter flights with a Boeing 727-200 while sometimes it reinforced the activities with Boeing 737s leased from other airlines.

== Fleet ==
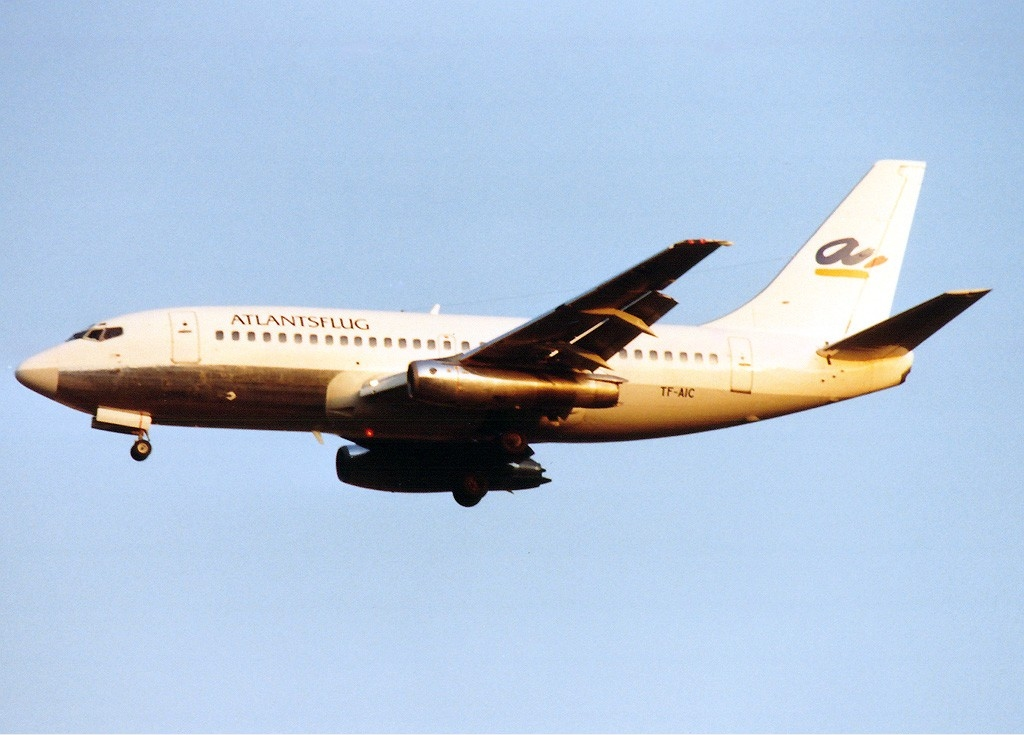
Boeing 737-200

The Atlantic Island Air fleet consisted of the following aircraft:

- 1 Boeing 727-200
- 1 Boeing 737-200
