= JAR-OPS 1 =

EU Joint Aviation Requirement

JAR-OPS 1 is the Joint Aviation Requirement for the operation of commercial air transport (aeroplanes). Any commercial airline within the European Union flying jet or propeller aircraft has to comply with this standard. Compliance is governed through the issuance of an Air Operator Certificate (AOC) and an Operator's Licence (OL).

An important provision of this standard is that the airline has to write and maintain an Operations Manual with a structure that mirrors the structure of the standard.

JAR OPS has been replaced with EU OPS.

The regulations concern Training, Documentation, Procedures and Compliances in the following categories

- Operator certification and supervision
- Operational procedures
- All weather operations
- Performance general
- Performance class l
- Performance class k
- Performance class h
- Mass and balance
- Instruments and equipment
- Communication and navigation equipment
- Aeroplane maintenance
- Flight crew
- Cabin crew
- Manuals, logs and records
- Flight and duty time limitations and rest requirements
- Transport of dangerous goods by air
- Security
