= Íslandsflug =

Icelandic airline and aircraft leasing company

IATA	ICAO	Call sign
HH	ICB	ICEBIRD
- Founded: 1991
- Ceased operations: 2004
- Hubs: Keflavik Airport
- Headquarters: Reykjavík, Iceland
- Website: islandsflug.is

Íslandsflug (Icelandic pronunciation: [ˈistlan(t)sˌflʏːɣ], lit. 'Iceland Air') was an airline and aircraft leasing company based at Keflavík International Airport, Reykjavík.

== History ==
The airline was established in 1991 by the merger of two small domestic scheduled airlines, Arnarflug innanlands hf. and Flugtak. In 1994, the airline began overnight parcel services to East Midlands Airport using a Fairchild Metro aircraft. The airline took delivery of its first ATR-42 in 1996. In 1997, the airline became a jet operator with the delivery of its first Boeing 737-200QC which was used for passenger and freight services.

Íslandsflug's first widebody aircraft, an Airbus A310, was delivered in 2001, making the airline the first Airbus operator in Iceland.

In 2005 it merged into Air Atlanta Icelandic. Landsflug took over the domestic operations of Islandsflug.

== Fleet ==
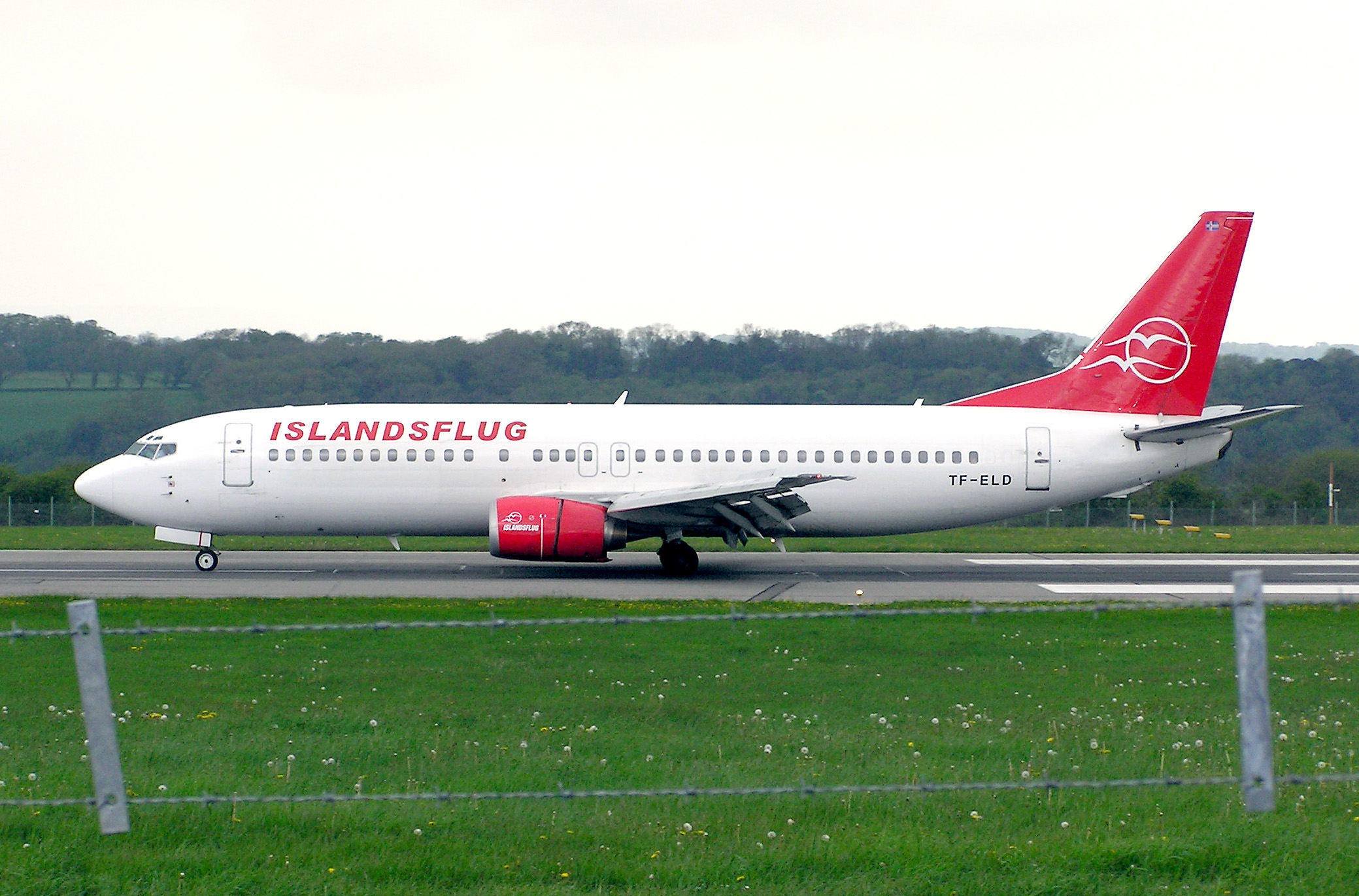
Islandsflug Boeing 737-400

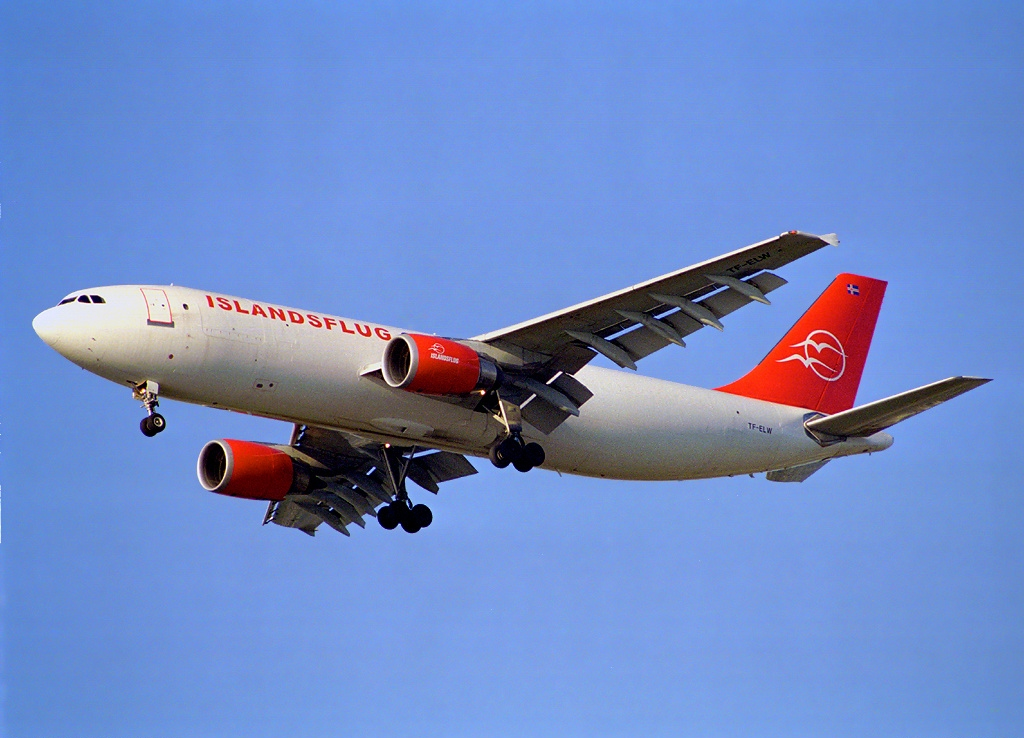
Islandsflug Cargo Airbus A300C4-605R

Íslandsflug operated the following aircraft:

- 9 Boeing 737-300
- 6 Boeing 737-400
- 6 Airbus A300
- 4 Dornier 228
- 3 Airbus A310
- 3 ATR 42
- 3 Beech 99
- 2 Boeing 737-200
- 1 Dornier 328
- 1 Swearingen Merlin

== Accidents and incidents ==
- On 23 June 2004 a Dornier 228 registered TF-ELH belly landed at Sigluförður Airport, due to pilot error. The only people aboard were the 2 pilots, who escaped unharmed.
