= Flugfélag Vestmannaeyja =

Icelandic regional airline

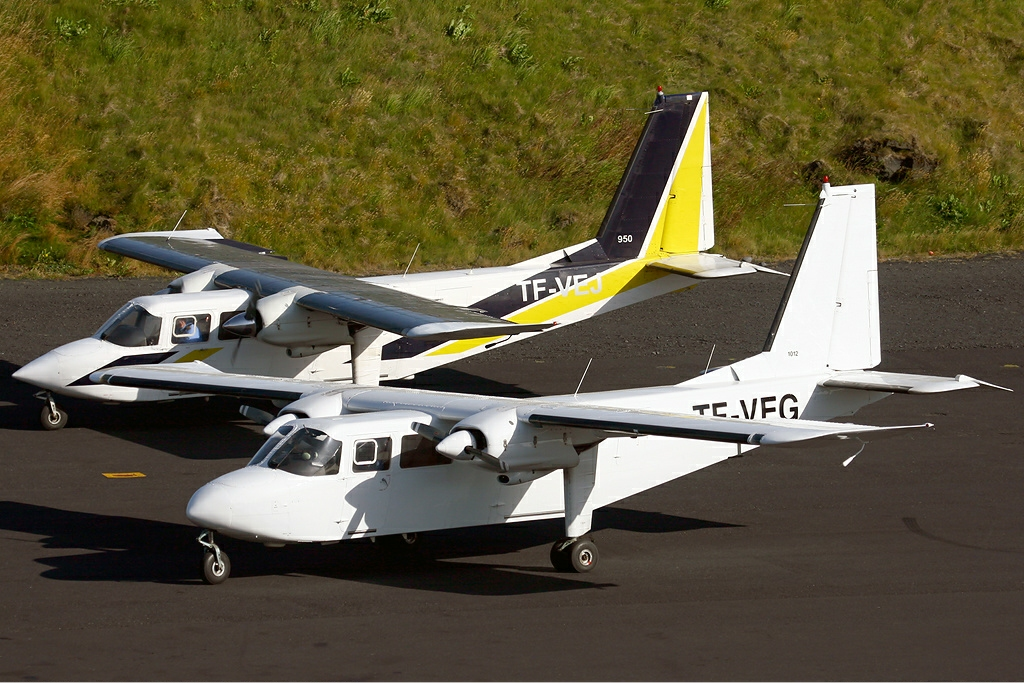
- Britten Norman Islander
IATA	ICAO	Call sign
—	FVM	ELEGANT
- Founded: 1983
- Commenced operations: 2001 (scheduled operations)
- Ceased operations: 2010
- Hubs: Vestmannaeyjar Airport
- Focus cities: Bakki
- Fleet size: 4
- Destinations: 3
- Headquarters: Vestmannaeyjar, Iceland
- Key people: Valgeir Arnórsson CEO / Managing Director
- Website: eyjaflug.is

Flugfélag Vestmannaeyja was a small regional airline based in the Vestmannaeyjar archipelago. It was operational from 1983 until 2010.

== History ==
The airline was established in 1983 to provide aviation services for the inhabitants of Vestmannaeyjar and also for tourists visiting the location. It operated both scheduled and charter services along with sightseeing and cargo flights. It also carried aout all ambulance flights from and to Vestmannaeyjar.

In 2001 it started scheduled flights between Vestmannaeyjar and Bakki, and 30.000 passengers were carried on this flight each year. With the impending opening of a new harbor and ferry terminal close to Bakki airport and with dwindling business the airline ceased operations in May 2010.
