= List of airlines of Iceland =

This is a list of airlines currently operating in Iceland.

== Scheduled airlines ==
Airline	Image	IATA	ICAO	Callsign	Commenced operations
Icelandair		FI	ICE	ICEAIR	1937
Norlandair			FNA	NORLANDAIR	2008

== Charter airlines ==
Airline	Image	IATA	ICAO	Callsign	Commenced operations
Air Atlanta Icelandic		CC	ABD	ATLANTA	1986
Atlantsflug				HEKLA	2004

== Cargo airlines ==
Airline	Image	IATA	ICAO	Callsign	Commenced operations
Icelandair Cargo		FI	ICE	ICEAIR	2000

== See also ==
- List of defunct airlines of Iceland
- Transport in Iceland
- List of airports in Iceland
- List of defunct airlines of Europe
